= Tropical cyclones in 2015 =

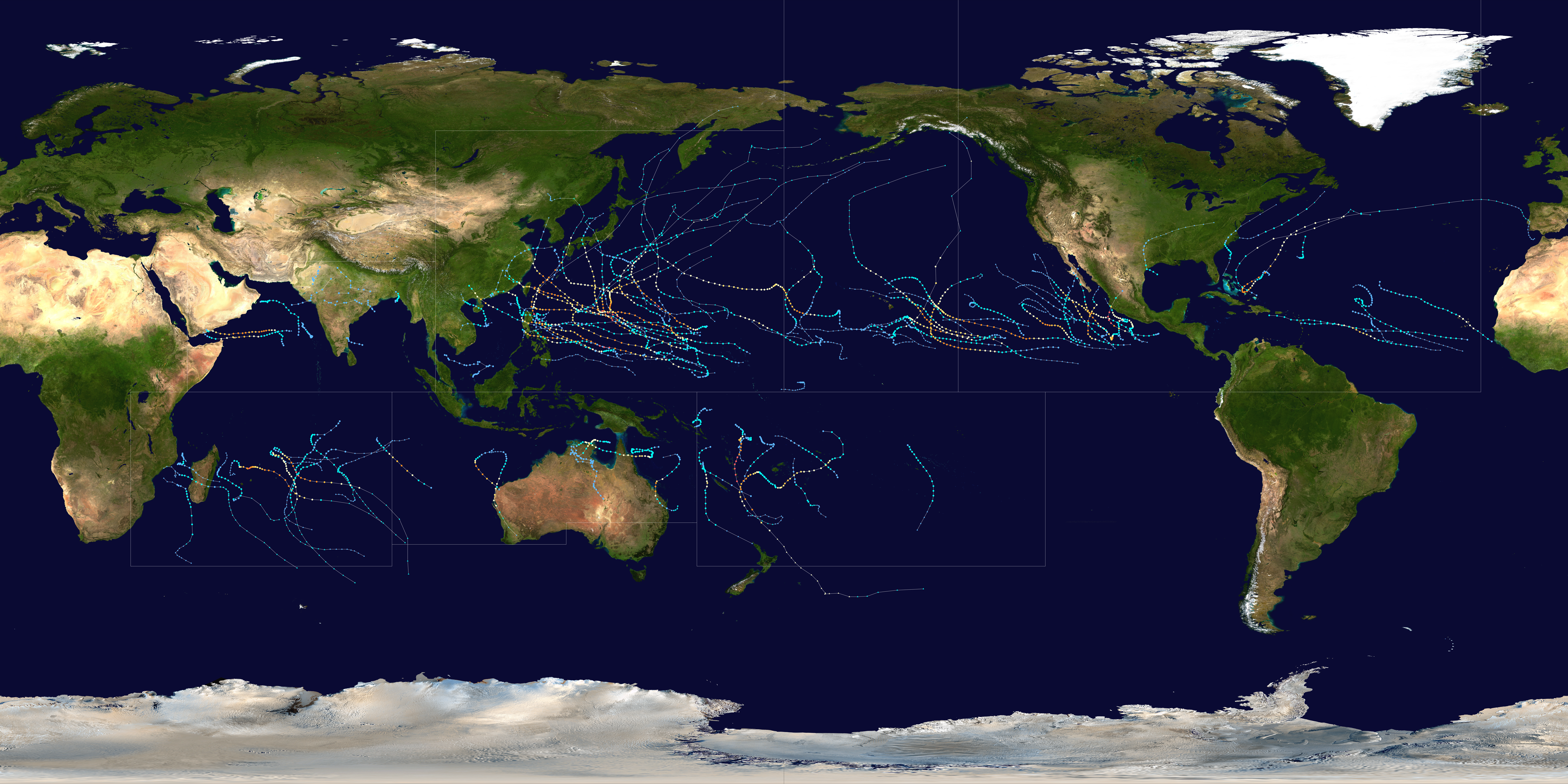
- Year summary map

Year boundaries
- First system: 05U
- Formed: January 2, 2015
- Last system: Ula
- Dissipated: January 12, 2016

Strongest system
- Name: Patricia
- Lowest pressure: 872 mbar (hPa); 25.75 inHg

Longest lasting system
- Name: Kilo
- Duration: 21 days

Year statistics
- Total systems: 140
- Named systems: 93
- Total fatalities: 1,069 total
- Total damage: $20.78 billion (2015 USD)
Related articles
- 2015 Atlantic hurricane season
- 2015 Pacific hurricane season
- 2015 Pacific typhoon season
- 2015 North Indian Ocean cyclone season
- 2014–15 South-West Indian Ocean cyclone season
- 2015–16 South-West Indian Ocean cyclone season
- 2014–15 Australian region cyclone season
- 2015–16 Australian region cyclone season
- 2014–15 South Pacific cyclone season
- 2015–16 South Pacific cyclone season

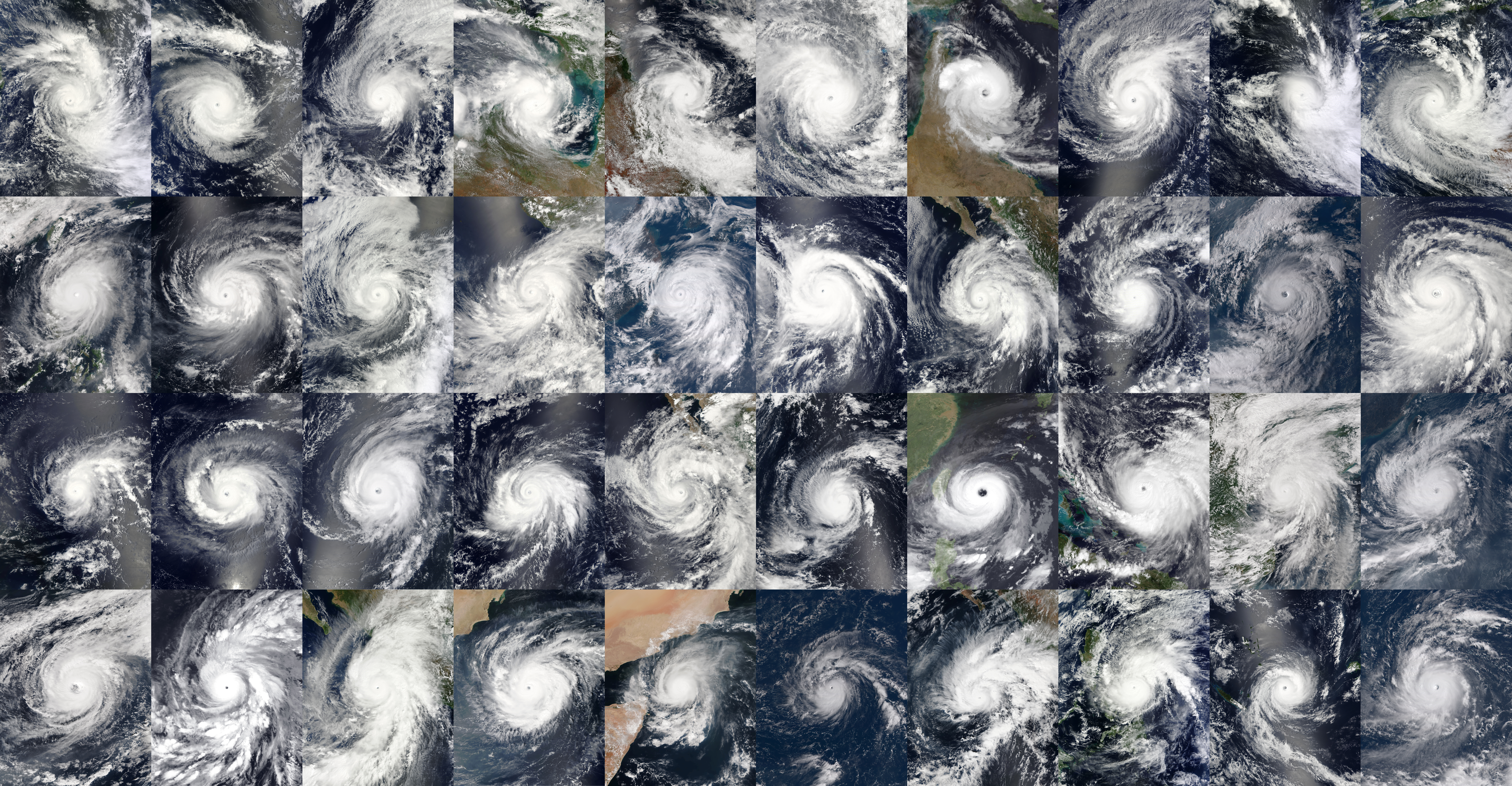
Taken by various of satellites throughout 2015, these are the 40 tropical cyclones that reached at least Category 3 on the Saffir-Simpson scale during that year, from Bansi in January to Ula in December (second to last image), though it peaked in January 2016. Among them, Patricia (third image in the fourth row) was the most intense with a minimum central pressure of 872 hPa.

During 2015, tropical cyclones formed in seven major bodies of water, commonly known as tropical cyclone basins. Tropical cyclones will be assigned names by various weather agencies if they attain maximum sustained winds of 35 knots (65 km/h; 40 mph). During the year, 140 systems have formed and 93 were named. The most intense storm of the year was Hurricane Patricia, with maximum 1-minute sustained wind speeds of 345 km/h (215 mph) and a minimum pressure of 872 hPa (25.75 inHg). The deadliest tropical cyclone was Cyclone Komen, which caused 280 fatalities in Southeast India and Bangladesh, while the costliest was Typhoon Mujigae, which caused an estimated $4.25 billion USD in damage after striking China. Throughout the year, a record-high forty Category 3 tropical cyclones formed, including thirty-two tropical cyclones of Category 4 and 5, while there were nine Category 5 tropical cyclones. The accumulated cyclone energy (ACE) index for the 2015 (seven basins combined), as calculated by Colorado State University (CSU) was 1,040 units, the fourth-highest on record.

The most active basin in the year was the Eastern Pacific which documented 26 named systems, was its basin's most active since 1992, despite only amounting to 25 named systems in the Western Pacific. Conversely, both the North Atlantic hurricane and North Indian Ocean cyclone seasons experienced a below average season numbering 11 and 4, respectively. Activity across the southern hemisphere's three basins–South-West Indian, Australian, and South Pacific–was spread evenly, with each region recording seven named storms apiece. That hemisphere's strongest tropical cyclone was Cyclone Pam, which bottomed out with a barometric pressure of 896 mbar (hPa; 26.46 inHg) in the South-Pacific Ocean.

Tropical cyclones are primarily monitored by a group of ten warning centers, which have been designated as a Regional Specialized Meteorological Centre (RSMC) or a Tropical Cyclone Warning Center (TCWC) by the World Meteorological Organization. These are the United States National Hurricane Center (NHC) and Central Pacific Hurricane Center, the Japan Meteorological Agency (JMA), the Indian Meteorological Department (IMD), Météo-France (MFR), Indonesia's Badan Meteorologi, Klimatologi, dan Geofisika, the Australian Bureau of Meteorology (BOM), Papua New Guinea's National Weather Service, the Fiji Meteorological Service (FMS) as well as New Zealand's MetService. Other notable warning centers include the Philippine Atmospheric, Geophysical, and Astronomical Services Administration (PAGASA), the United States Joint Typhoon Warning Center (JTWC), and the Brazilian Navy Hydrographic Center (BNHC).

== Global atmospheric and hydrological conditions ==
=== Background ===
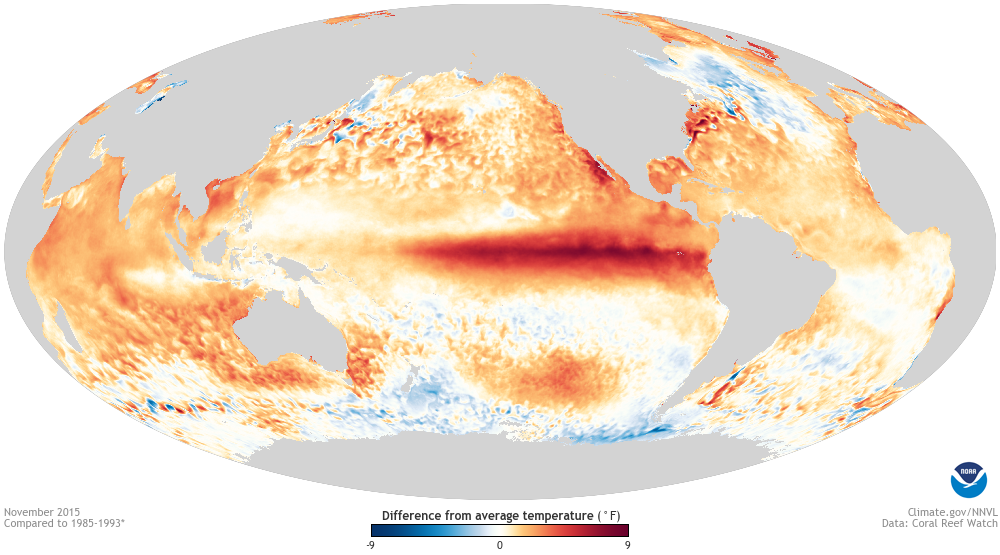
Map of sea surface temperature (SST) anomalies in the Pacific Ocean in November 2015

By January 2015, westerly wind burst activity picked up again. The first Kelvin wave developed around March and another formed around May. In addition, another strong westerly wind burst event took place around July as a result of twin tropical cyclones straddling the equator. An even stronger event in October, and an unusually stronger event during late December 2015 into January 2016, also resulted from twin cyclones on opposite sides of the equator. In May 2015, the Australian Bureau of Meteorology respectively confirmed the arrival of weak El Niño conditions. El Niño conditions were forecast in July to intensify into strong conditions by fall and winter of 2015. In addition to the warmer than normal waters generated by the El Niño conditions, the Pacific Decadal Oscillation was also creating persistently higher than normal sea surface temperatures in the northeastern Pacific. In August, the NOAA CPC predicted that the 2015 El Niño "could be among the strongest in the historical record dating back to 1950." In mid November, NOAA reported that the temperature anomaly in the Niño 3.4 region for the 3-month average from August to October 2015 was the 2nd warmest on record with only 1997 warmer.

After Typhoon Higos developed during February 2015, a new forecast scenario opened: El Niño might strengthen and persist through 2015. This scenario was supported by the same climate features that had predicted the weak El Niño developing during 2014. During their March 2015 diagnostic discussion, NOAA's CPC and the IRI reported that El Niño conditions had been observed during February 2015, after the above average sea surface temperatures had become weakly coupled with the tropical atmosphere.

During November and December 2015, values within NOAA's Oceanic Niño Index peaked at 2.4 °C (4.3 °F), which surpassed December 1997 value of 2.2 °C (4.0 °F). NOAA subsequently reported that the 3-month average from November 2015 to January 2016 of the ONI had peaked at 2.3 °C (4.1 °F), which meant that the 2014–16 event was tied with the 1997–98 event for the strongest values on record. However, overall the event was considered to be one of the three strongest El Nino events since 1950, since there was a number of different ways to measure the strength of an event. The event subsequently started to weaken with sea surface temperature anomalies across the equatorial pacific decreasing, while predictions about a possible La Niña event taking place during 2016 started to be made.

=== Effects ===
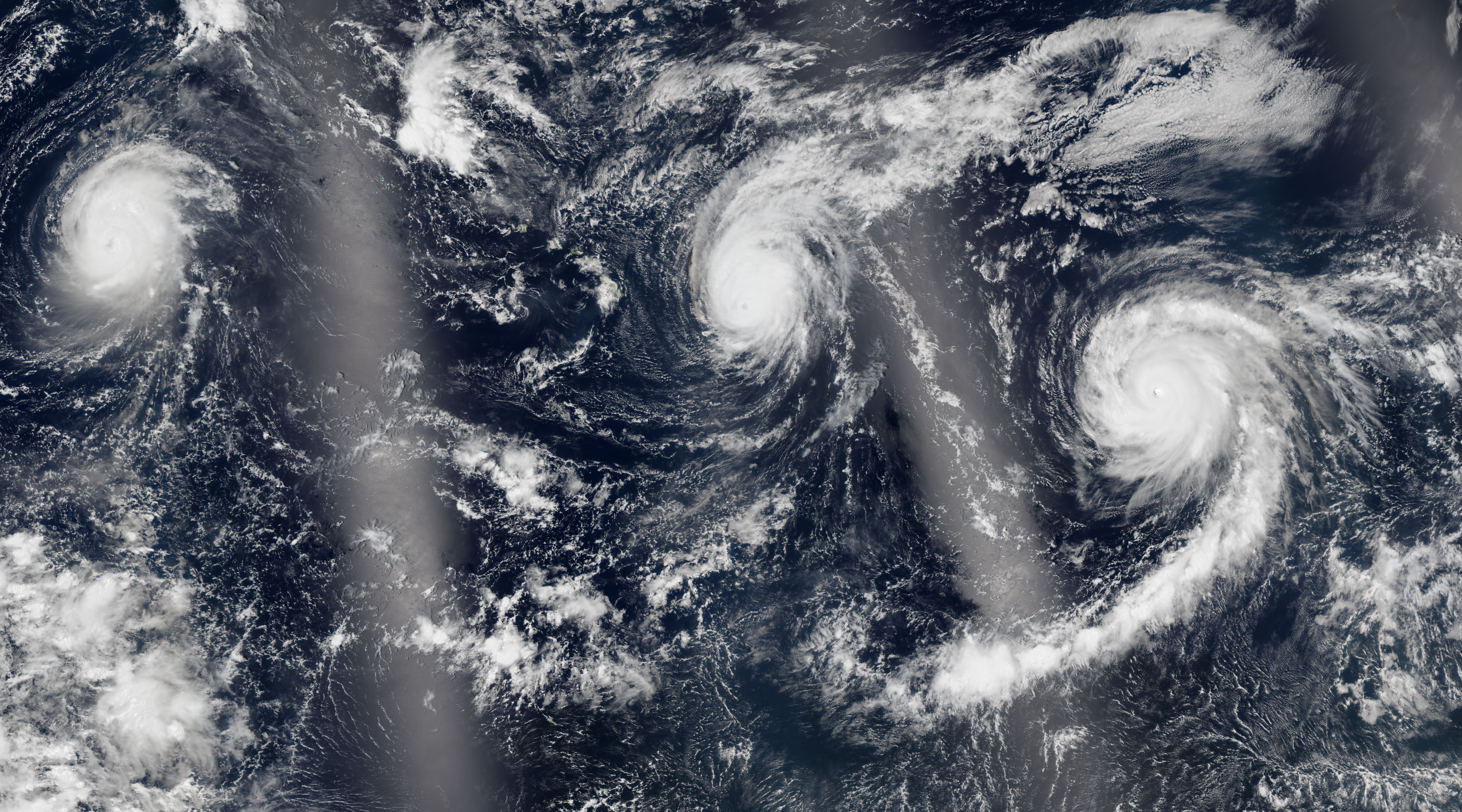
Hurricanes Kilo (left), Ignacio (center), and Jimena (right), all at major hurricane intensity, spanning the Central and Eastern Pacific basins on August 30

The 2014–16 El Niño event influenced tropical cyclone activity around the world, where it contributed to record breaking seasons in the Central Pacific and Eastern Pacific tropical cyclone basins. By contrast, it limited Atlantic hurricane activity, producing strong vertical wind shear, increased atmospheric stability, stronger sinking motion and drier air across the tropical Atlantic. The Central Pacific basin saw its most active tropical cyclone season on record with 16 tropical cyclones recorded during 2015. Within the Southern Hemisphere, the El Niño pushed tropical cyclone activity in the South Pacific Ocean eastwards, with activity flourishing near Vanuatu, Fiji and Tonga. As a result of this displacement and other factors such as a positive Indian Ocean Dipole, the 2015–16 Australian region cyclone season was the least active since reliable records started during the 1950s, with only three named tropical cyclones developing in the region compared to an average of eleven.

The event also contributed to six systems forming outside of the season boundaries, within the North Atlantic, Eastern and Southern Pacific basins. These systems included Tropical Cyclone Raquel, which was considered by some to be a part of both the 2014–15 and 2015–16 seasons, but was later deemed to only be a part of the 2014–15 season. Tropical Depressions 01F and 02F developed in the South Pacific during July and October 2015, which affected Fiji, Vanuatu and the Solomon Islands. Tropical Depression Nine-C subsequently formed in the Central Pacific on 31 December, whose remnants in turn contributed to the development of Hurricane Pali on 7 January. This also caused the latest end and earliest start to the 2015 and 2016 Pacific hurricane seasons, respectively.

Other significant tropical cyclones during the event included: Cyclone Pam, which became the second most intense tropical cyclone in the South Pacific in terms of wind speed and devastated Vanuatu; Cyclone Winston, was the most intense tropical cyclone in the Southern Hemisphere and devastated Fiji; Cyclone Fantala, which was the strongest storm in terms of 1-minute and 10-minute sustained winds in the South Indian Ocean; and Hurricane Patricia, which was the second-most-intense tropical cyclone on record globally in terms of barometric pressure, and the strongest in terms of 1-minute sustained winds.

== Summary ==
=== North Atlantic Ocean ===
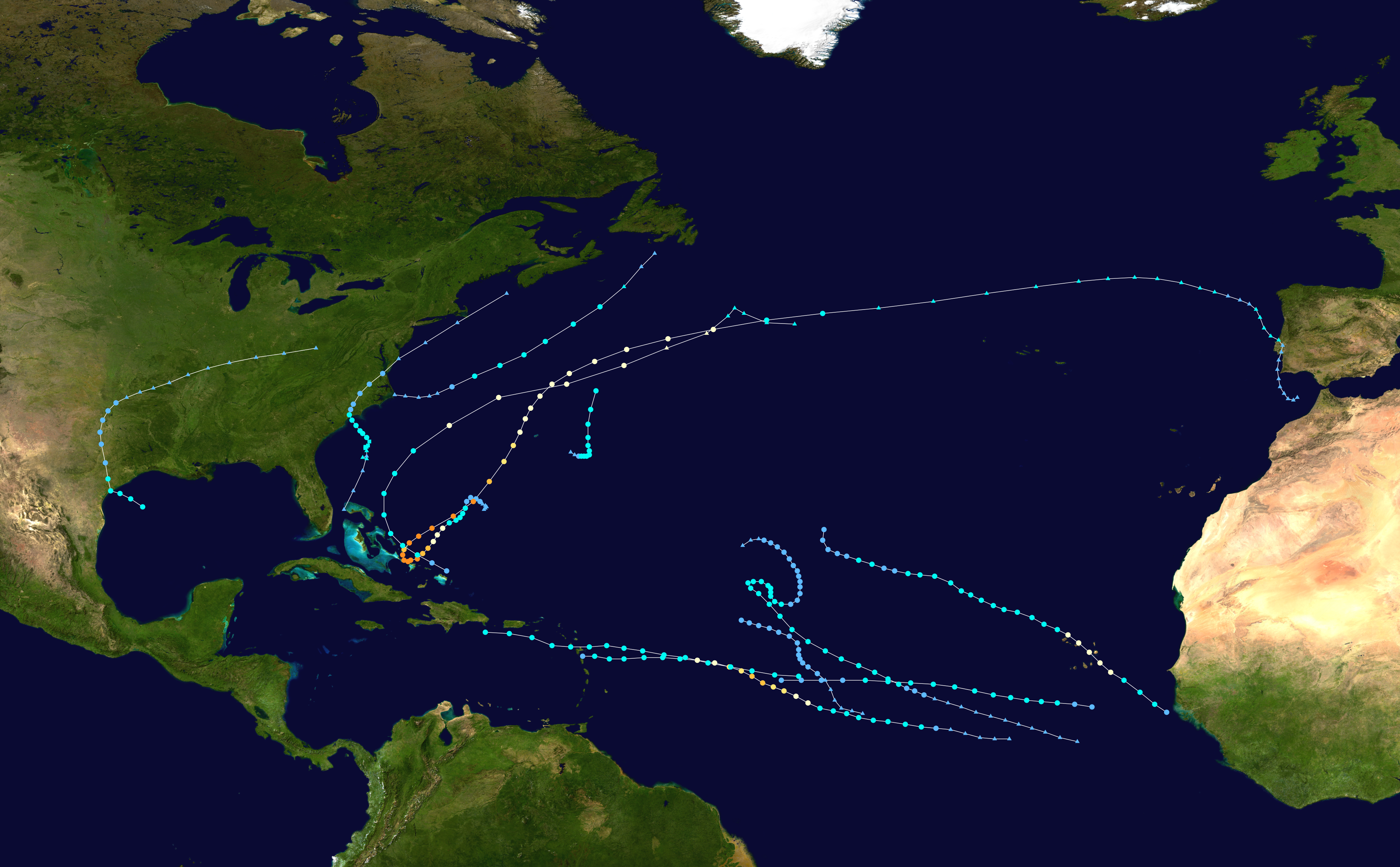
2015 Atlantic hurricane season summary map

The season was the last of three consecutive below-average Atlantic hurricane seasons. It was a slightly below average season in which twelve tropical cyclones formed. Eleven of the twelve designated cyclones attained tropical storm status. Of the eight tropical storms, four reached at least Category 1 hurricane intensity. The 2015 season extended the period without major hurricane landfalls in the United States to ten years, with the last such system being Hurricane Wilma in 2005. The lack of activity was primarily attributed to an atmospheric circulation that favored dry, sinking air over low latitudes to the west of 40°W and westerly wind shear enhanced by El Niño. A few notable events occurred during the season. Ana was the first tropical cyclone to form in the off-season since Beryl in 2012. Erika became only the second storm in the satellite era to be retired without reaching hurricane strength (Tropical Storm Allison was the first) and only the third to be retired without having made landfall (Hurricanes Klaus and Fabian were the first and second, respectively). Fred was one of the easternmost tropical storms recorded and made landfall in Cape Verde as a Category 1 hurricane, becoming the first hurricane to strike that country since 1892. Joaquin was the most intense storm of non-tropical origin in the satellite era and the strongest to affect the Bahamas in October since 1866. The tropical cyclones of this season caused 89 deaths and at least $731.8 million in damage. The Atlantic hurricane season officially ended on November 30, 2015. Tropical cyclogenesis began early, with Ana developing on May 8, over three weeks prior to the official beginning of the season and far ahead of the long-term climatological average of July 9. The month of June featured one tropical cyclone, Bill, which formed on June 16. Claudette, the only system in the month of July, developed on July 13. The rate of tropical cyclogenesis increased in August, though no storms developed in the first half of the month. Danny, the season's first major hurricane, formed on August 16, followed by Erika on August 24, and Fred on August 30. September, which is the climatological peak of hurricane season, featured five additional tropical cyclones – Grace, Henri, Tropical Depression Nine, Ida, and Joaquin. The most intense storm of the season was Joaquin, which peaked as a strong Category 4 hurricane with maximum sustained winds of 155 mph (250 km/h), just short of Category 5 on the Saffir–Simpson hurricane wind scale. Joaquin lasted into October, though no other systems developed that month. The season's final cyclone, Kate, developed on November 8 and became extratropical on November 11. The season's activity was reflected with an Accumulated Cyclone Energy (ACE) rating of 63, which was well below the 1981–2010 median of 92.

=== Eastern & Central Pacific Oceans ===
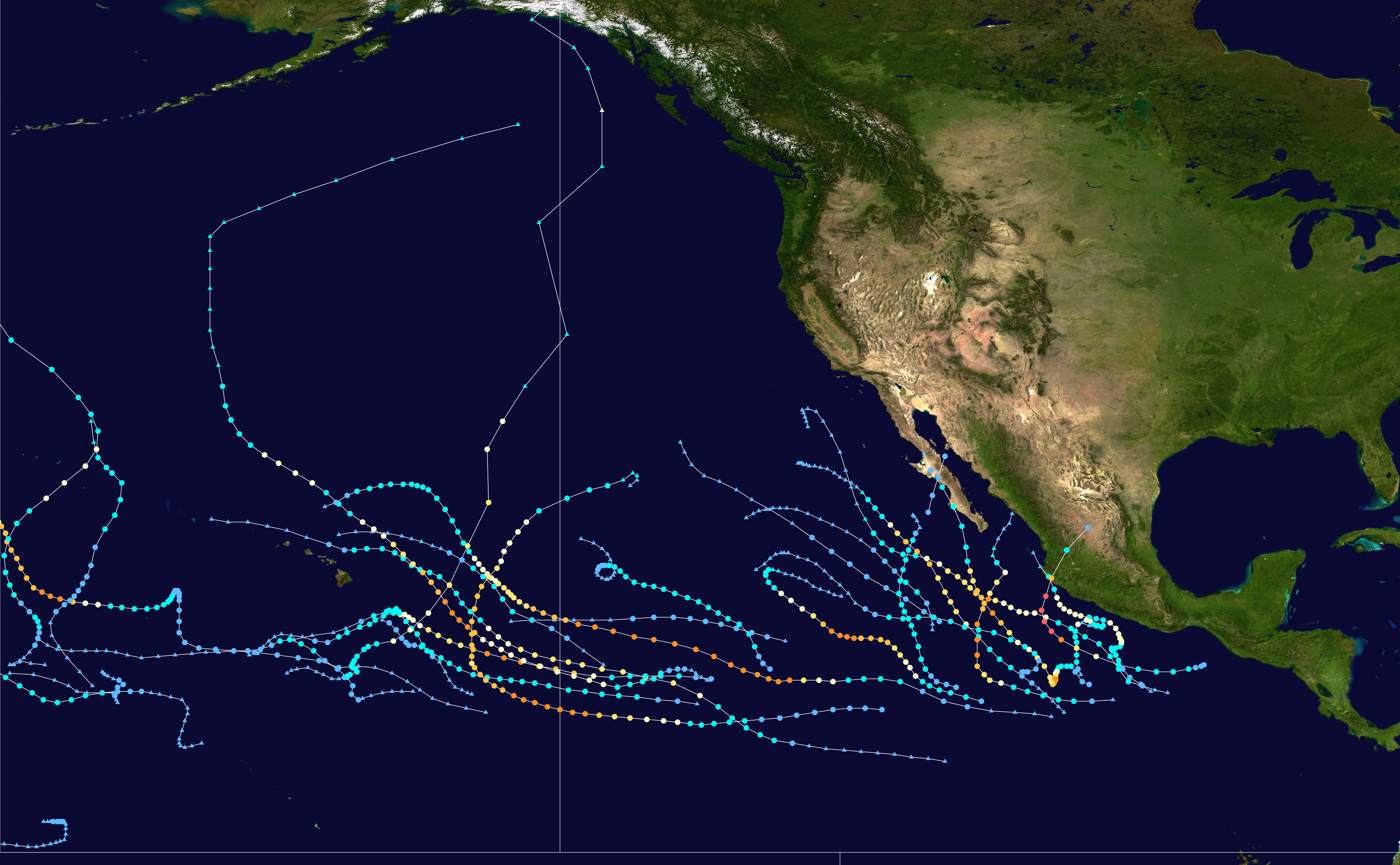
2015 Pacific hurricane season summary map

Overall, 31 tropical cyclones formed, of which 26 reached tropical storm intensity and were named. A total of 16 of these storms became hurricanes, and a record-breaking 11 became major hurricanes. (Note: A major hurricane is one that reaches at least Category 3 status on the Saffir–Simpson scale.) These values make the 2015 season the second-most active on record. The Central Pacific, meanwhile, had its most active year on record, with 16 tropical cyclones forming in or entering the basin, easily surpassing the old record of 11 set in 1992 and 1994. The season officially began on May 15 in the Eastern Pacific, and on June 1 in the Central Pacific; the season ended officially on November 30, though a tropical depression formed well after that on December 31. The well-above-average activity levels were largely attributed to the strong 2014–16 El Niño event, which brought anomalously high sea surface temperatures and low vertical wind shear to western parts of the basin. In fact, for the region between the 116th meridian west and the International Date Line, sea surface temperatures from July to October averaged 28 °C (82 °F), the highest value on record since reliable data records began in 1979. Around Hawaii, sea surface temperatures were 0.9 °C (1.6 °F) higher than at any point during the past 60 years. Wind shear in the region was also at its lowest on record during that period. The existence of a large region of rising air over the basin during much of the season, a feature typical of El Niño events, further facilitated the development and intensification of the season's numerous tropical cyclones.

The season started off with three successive hurricanes, with Andres and Blanca both reaching Category 4 status. On June 3, Blanca became both earliest second hurricane and second major hurricane in the basin since reliable records began in 1971, and became the earliest instance of a landfall on the Baja California Peninsula. Ten days later, Carlos became the second-earliest third hurricane on record. After about a month of inactivity, eight systems formed in July, including five from July 8–12. Ela became the earliest named storm to form in the Central Pacific within the bounds of the official season, and along with Iune and Halola, marked the first month in the satellite era where three tropical cyclones were observed in the Central Pacific. Six more systems formed in an active August. Early on August 30, Hurricanes Kilo, Ignacio and Jimena intensified into Category 4 hurricanes. This was the first time in the historical record that three or more major hurricanes existed simultaneously in the Pacific east of the International Date Line, and that two or more major hurricanes existed simultaneously in the Central Pacific.

September saw the formation of five systems, excluding Kevin which was named in September but formed on August 31. Three systems—Linda, Sixteen-E, and Marty—affected Mexico, with the first two also bringing floods to the Southwestern United States. The flood event caused by Linda in Utah was also the state's deadliest. October saw another five systems. With the formation of Oho on October 3, the 2015 season surpassed 1992 and 1994 as the most active year on record in the Central Pacific. During October 18–19, Olaf became the southernmost-forming hurricane and major hurricane in the Eastern Pacific. Olaf later became the first system on record to cross from the Eastern Pacific into the Central Pacific and then back into the Eastern Pacific while still a tropical cyclone. Patricia became the strongest hurricane in the basin on October 23 when its pressure fell to 892 mbar (hPa; 26.34 inHg), breaking the previous record of 902 mbar (hPa; 26.64 inHg) set by 1997's Hurricane Linda. Patricia subsequently became the strongest tropical cyclone on record in the Western Hemisphere in terms of barometric pressure, with a central pressure of 872 mbar (hPa; 25.75 inHg). This value was also the second-lowest globally, behind Typhoon Tip of 1979 which had a central pressure of 870 mbar (hPa; 25.69 inHg). Additionally, its maximum sustained winds of 215 mph (345 km/h) were the strongest ever reliably recorded or estimated anywhere globally. Patricia later became the strongest Pacific hurricane to strike Mexico after making landfall in Jalisco as a strong Category 4 hurricane.

The following month tied for the most active November with the development of two systems, Rick and Sandra. Sandra subsequently strengthened into a major hurricane, bringing the season total to a record 11. Its peak winds of 150 mph (240 km/h) and minimum central pressure of 934 mbar (hPa; 27.58 inHg) surpassed Hurricane Kenneth of 2011 for the strongest November Pacific hurricane in terms of both sustained winds and central pressure. Despite the official end of the season on November 30, anomalously favorable conditions in the Central Pacific gave rise to the final storm of the season, Tropical Depression Nine-C, which formed on December 31 and dissipated late the same day. This marked the latest end to a Pacific hurricane season on record.

=== Western Pacific Ocean ===
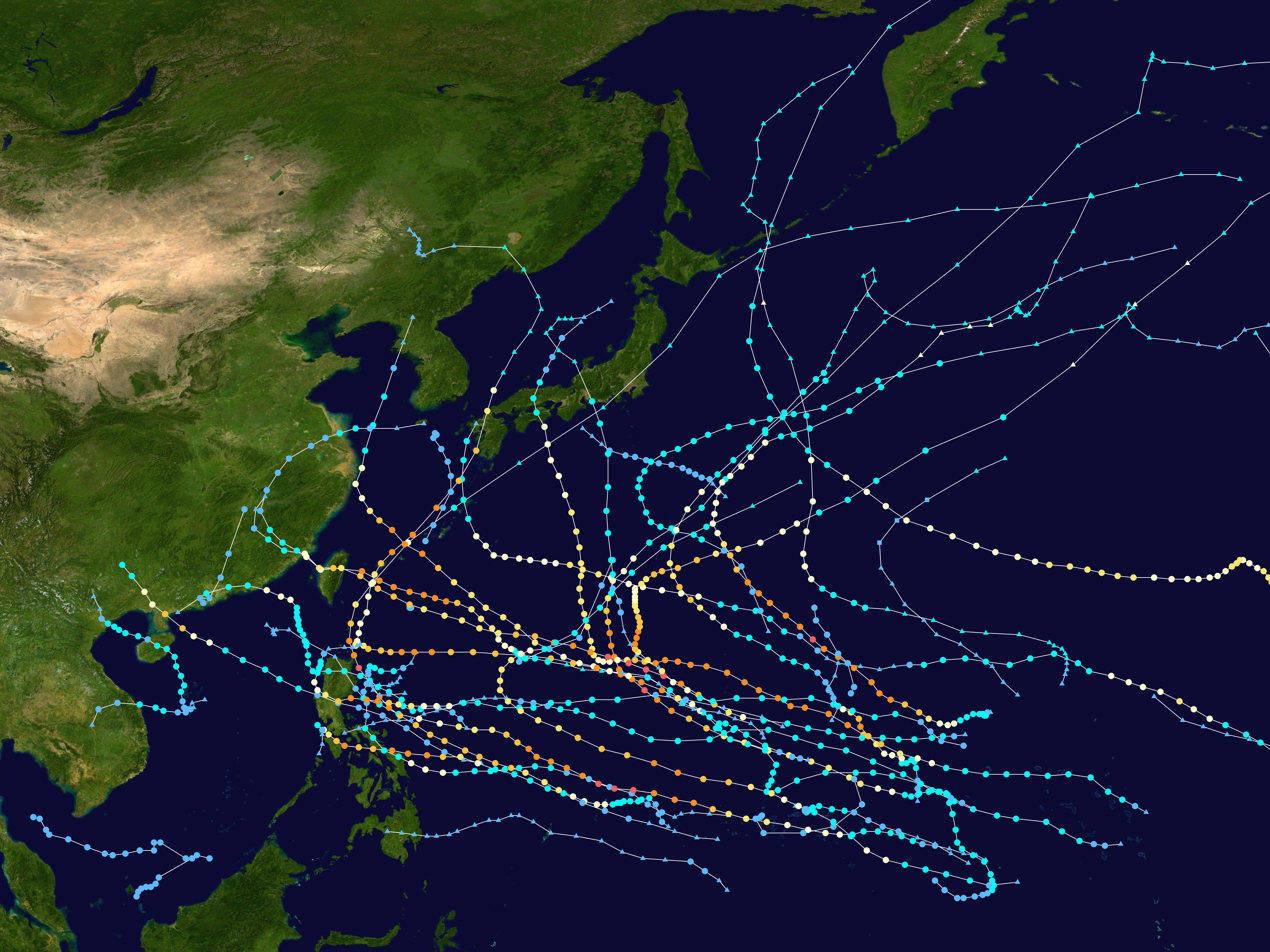
2015 Pacific typhoon season summary map

Most of the 27 tropical cyclones affected Micronesia, because of the record-tying 2014–16 El Niño event. 2015 opened with Tropical Depression Jangmi (Seniang) from the previous season active within the Sulu Sea, to the north of Malaysia, on January 1, 2015. The system subsequently moved south-eastward, made landfall on Malaysia, and dissipated later that day. However, the official first tropical cyclone of the season was a minor tropical depression, in the same place where Jangmi persisted on January 2, but dissipated two days later. Tropical Storm Mekkhala, on January 13, developed and approached the Philippines where it caused minor damages and also notably interrupted Pope Francis's visit to the country. In early-February, Typhoon Higos developed further east of the basin and reached peak strength of a Category 4 typhoon. Higos became the strongest typhoon on record in the month of February when it broke the record of Typhoon Nancy (1970), and was in turn surpassed by Typhoon Wutip in 2019. During the opening days of March 2015, a major westerly wind burst occurred, which subsequently contributed to the development of the 2014–16 El Niño event and Tropical Storm Bavi. Typhoon Maysak developed and became the most intense pre-April tropical cyclone on record, with maximum 280 km/h (175 mph) 1-minute sustained winds and a minimum pressure of 910 mbar (27 inHg) at its peak intensity. Only one weak system (Haishen) formed in April, which caused little to no damage.

In May, two storms, Typhoons Noul and Dolphin, both reached Category 5 super typhoon intensity. Both typhoons affected landmasses and altogether caused about $37.1 million in damages, respectively. Kujira formed in June and made landfall in southeast Asia, bringing flooding. During the first week of July, the tropics rapidly became active, with a trio typhoons developing simultaneously and affecting three different landmasses. Total damages from Chan-hom, Linfa and Nangka nearly reached US$2 billion. Afterwards, Typhoon Halola entered the basin from the Eastern Pacific. In August, Typhoon Soudelor made landfall in Taiwan and China, where it killed 38 people and damages totaled up to US$3.7 billion. Typhoon Goni badly affected the Philippines, the Ryukyu Islands and Kyushu as an intense typhoon, causing about US$293 million in damages.

In September, Tropical Storm Etau brought flooding in much of Japan, with damages at least US$100 million. Tropical Storm Vamco made landfall over in Vietnam and caused moderate impact and damages. Typhoon Dujuan, similar to Soudelor, impacted China and Taiwan with total damages of $660 million as a Category 4 super typhoon. In early October, Typhoon Mujigae rapidly intensified into a Category 4 typhoon when it made landfall over Zhanjiang, spawning a tornado causing 29 deaths and over US$4 billion in damages. Later, Typhoon Koppu devastated the Philippines as a super typhoon, causing at least $230 million in damages and killing at least 55 people. Typhoon In-fa became a strong typhoon in November, causing minor impact over in the Caroline Islands. In December, Typhoon Melor maintained Category 4 intensity as it passed the Philippine Islands with 42 deaths and US$140 million in damages, while a tropical depression, named Onyok by PAGASA, made landfall in southern Philippines. The final tropical cyclone of the year developed near Malaysia on December 20, and dissipated three days later.

=== North Indian Ocean ===
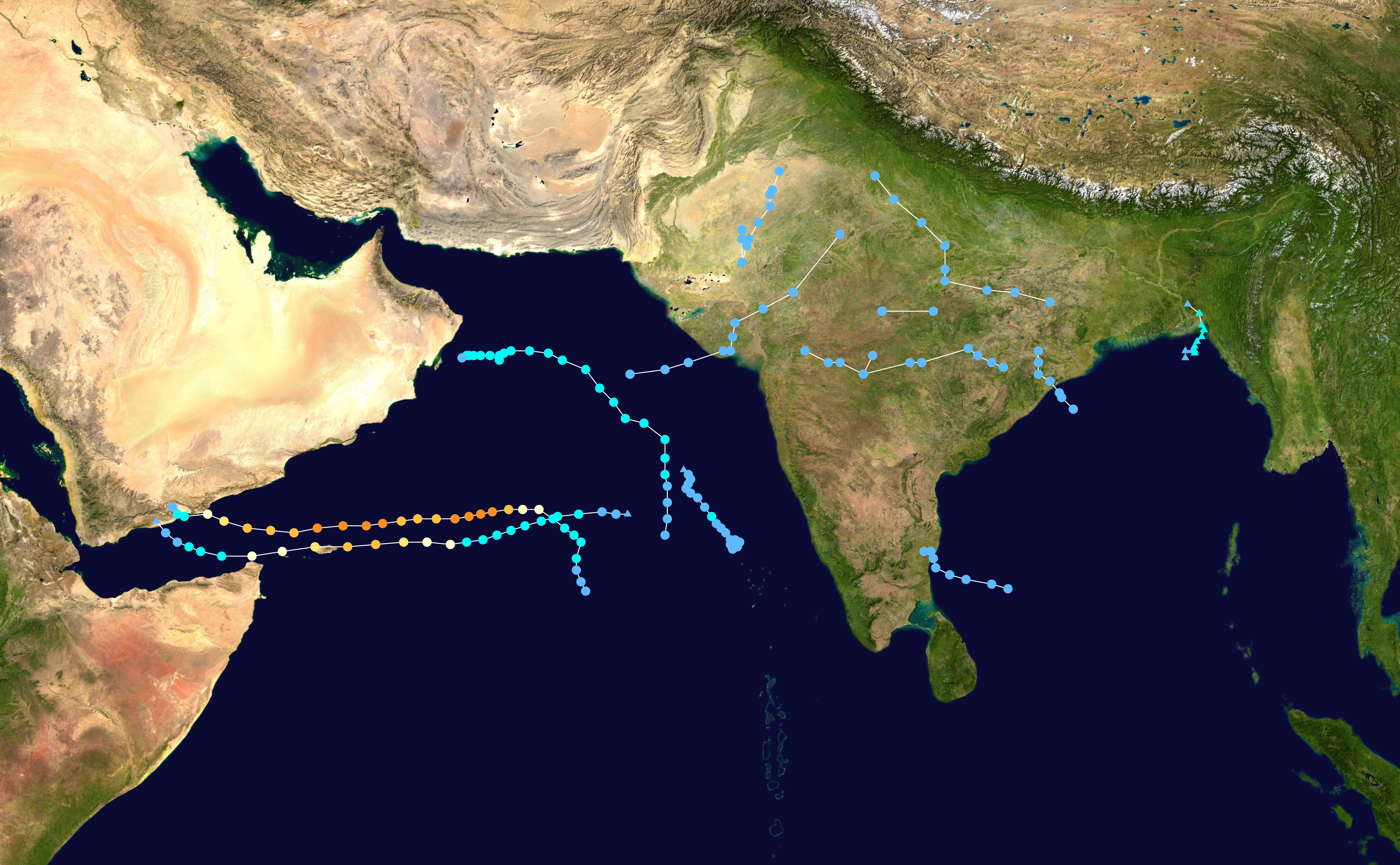
2015 North Indian Ocean cyclone season summary map

The season started rather late compared to the last two years, with the first storm, Ashobaa, not developing until June 7. Ashobaa was followed by 2 depressions, before Komen formed in July. Komen produced torrential rainfall in Bangladesh. September featured no storms, before Chapala formed at the end of October. Chapala rapidly intensified over the Arabian Sea into an Extremely Severe Cyclonic Storm, becoming the strongest in the Arabian Sea since Gonu in 2007. Chapala also became the only hurricane force system to make landfall in Yemen, and the first since 1922 in Socotra. Chapala was followed by Megh, which reached a weaker intensity in the same general area.

Under the influence of an ongoing onset of a southwest monsoon, a low-pressure area formed on June 6. It slowly consolidated, prompting the Joint Typhoon Warning Center (JTWC) to issue a Tropical Cyclone Formation Alert (TCFA) on June 6. The following day, the India Meteorological Department (IMD) issued its first advisory for the system, designating it ARB 01. Later the same day, the JTWC reported the storm had reached tropical cyclone intensity, and on June 8, the IMD upgraded the storm to a cyclonic storm, assigning it the name Ashobaa. The storm continued to track northwestwards for a while, before turning westwards and weakening due to moderate to high wind shear and land interaction. Due to most of the moisture being drawn into the storm, the onset of the southwest monsoon over the Indian subcontinent was stalled. Torrential rains fell across much of eastern Oman, with Masirah Island receiving 225 mm (8.9 in) of rain in one day and more than 250 mm (9.8 in) overall. Significant flooding prompted dozens of evacuations while strong winds caused power outages. Waterlogging was reported in Kalba and Fujairah, in the United Arab Emirates, due to disturbed weather attributed to Ashobaa.

An area of low pressure developed off the east coast of India on June 17, about 135 nmi (250 km; 155 mi) east-southeast of Visakhapatnam. Over the next two days, deep convection developed along the southern and western periphery of the centre of the system, predominantly under the influence of the advancing southwest monsoon. Due to the moderate-to-strong wind shear caused by the monsoon, the disturbance failed to develop any further, and the JTWC had reported that it dissipated on June 20. At the same time, however, the IMD started tracking this system as a depression, reporting gusts of up to 35 kn (65 km/h; 40 mph). The depression made landfall over Odisha coast early on June 21, between Gopalpur and Puri. Without any further information, the IMD stopped tracking BOB 01 on June 22. Rough seas from the depression caught many fishing vessels off-guard, with at least 150 people reported missing offshore on June 21. The vast majority either returned to shore safely or were rescued within a day; however, nine fishermen are feared to have drowned. The entire state of Odisha was put on alert on June 21–23. The system brought heavy rains to most of the state, with Malkangiri receiving the highest, 320 mm (13 in) of rain. Access to many towns in the Malkangiri district was blocked due to flooding. At least six deaths took place from flood-related incidents.

Following the series of monsoonal disturbances, a fresh wave of thunderstorms organized into an area of low pressure on June 21, in the Arabian Sea, off the coast of Gujarat. Deep convection persisted to the west of the system while the circulation continued to develop over the next 24 hours, and the IMD started tracking it as a depression, with the identifier ARB 02. ARB 02 continued to evolve and by the night of June 22, the JTWC issued a TCFA on the system, while it was 285 nmi (528 km; 328 mi) west-northwest of Mumbai. Torrential rains battered Gujarat, with peak accumulations of 636 mm (25.0 in) in Bagasara, 511 mm (20.1 in) in Dhari, and 400 mm (16 in) in Variyav. Severe flooding ensued across the region, isolating many villages in the Saurashtra region, and prompted mobilization of the National Disaster Response Force and Indian Air Force. Flooding in the Amreli district was reported to be the worst in 90 years; 600 of the district's 838 villages were affected, 400 of which were rendered inaccessible by land. At least 80 people died in the region, with Saurashtra suffering the greatest losses. Ten Asiatic lions, an endangered species with only 523 living individuals documented in May 2015, died during the floods while more than a dozen remain missing. The Gujarat government estimated damage at ₹16.5 billion (US$258 million); however, Congress MLA Paresh Dhanani claimed damage to be as high as ₹70 billion (US$1.09 billion).

At 03:00 UTC (08:30 AM IST) on July 10, a depression formed over land over Jharkhand, close to Ranchi. It drifted in a generally northwestward direction and dissipated early on July 12 over the periphery of Uttar Pradesh and adjoining areas of Haryana. The system produced extremely heavy downpours, breaking the record in the city of Gwalior, Madhya Pradesh for the maximum amount of rainfall in 24 hours. The city received 191 mm (8 in) of rainfall in a day breaking the previous record of 149.9 mm (6 in) which was set around the same period in 1947. The rainfall received was also more than 75% of the average monthly rainfall of 250.7 mm (10 in) in the city. In Odisha, at least 14 villages were inundated by floods directly linked to the depression. The Hirakud Dam authorities had announced that they would be releasing waters on July 13 from the river Mahanadi. The states of Uttar Pradesh and Haryana also received torrential rains from the system.

On July 26 a depression formed inland over the Ganges delta. Early on July 30, the system was upgraded to a cyclonic storm by the IMD and named as Komen while making a U-turn. On August 2, Komen was no longer a tropical cyclone. Torrential rains impacted much of Myanmar, causing widespread flooding. At least 46 people were killed and more than 200,000 were affected. Additionally, at least 17,000 homes were destroyed. Tremendous rains fell across southeastern Bangladesh, with accumulations Komen and the monsoonal system it originated from reaching 1,051.2 mm (41.39 in) in Chittagong. The resulting floods killed at least 23 people and affected more than 130,400. A landslide in the Bandarban District killed six people. Flooding in Odisha, India, killed five people and affected at least 480,399. At least 69 people died across West Bengal from various incidents directly and indirectly to the storm, such as electrocution and snake bites. A total of 272,488 homes were destroyed while a further 55,899 sustained damage. At least 21 people died in Manipur, 20 of whom perished in a landslide that struck Joumol village.

A trough over Madhya Pradesh drifted westwards into eastern Rajasthan and lead to the formation of an area of low pressure in its vicinity on July 24. Continuing on its westward track, the system became more organised and intensified into a depression on July 27, to the west of Jodhpur. A western disturbance over Pakistan and adjoining areas of Jammu and Kashmir kept the system from moving further north into drier portions of Rajasthan. This allowed it to intensify further into a deep depression, about 110 km (68 mi) southeast of Barmer. However, the system accelerated in a chiefly northward track on July 29, absorbing dry air along its path. It weakened rapidly and dissipated to the north of Bikaner on the following day. Heavy rainfall brought by the system lead to flash flooding in districts of Rajasthan and Gujarat. Chief Minister of Gujarat Anandiben Patel ordered rescue teams to carry out relief activities in Kutch, Patan, Banaskantha, and other districts of the state, as a result.

A depression forms in Madhya Pradesh on 4 August and has a maximum winds of 45 km/h (30 mph). One day later it weakened as well marked low-pressure area. It made its impact in Madhya Pradesh.

In early October, a low-pressure area formed over the Arabian Sea. It slowly consolidated, prompting the JTWC to issue a TCFA on October 7. On October 9, the IMD started issuing its advisories for the system, designating it ARB 03. During the late hours of October 9, the JTWC stated the storm had reached gale-force winds, and commenced its advisories. On the following day, the depression intensified into a Deep depression, reaching its peak intensity with sustained wind speeds at 55 km/h (35 mph) and a minimum central pressure estimated near 1,001 mbar (29.56 inHg). On the following days, the storm followed a generally northwestward track, where it encountered areas having low mid-to-upper level moisture in the atmosphere. The system struggled to maintain its intensity and weakened, prompting the JTWC to issue its final warning on ARB 03 in the morning of October 11. On next day, IMD reported that the storm had degenerated into a well-marked low-pressure area. The storm, being over water during its entire lifespan, did not directly impact any landmass. However, under the influence of the storm's rain bands, heavy Rains lashed the Kanyakumari district of Tamil Nadu, India. The reservoir of Chittar I, a dam near Kanyakumari, recorded 216.4 mm (8.52 in) of rainfall.

A low-pressure area formed over the Arabian Sea on October 26. It slowly consolidated, prompting the IMD to classify it a depression on October 28. Later the same day, the JTWC issued its Tropical Cyclone Formation Alert (TCFA) for the system, and the IMD upgraded the storm to deep depression intensity. Further intensification ensued, causing the IMD to upgrade the system to a cyclonic storm, naming it Chapala. Over the following hours, the storm intensified into a severe cyclonic storm and further into a very severe cyclonic storm. Rapid intensification commenced and Chapala was upgraded into an extremely severe cyclonic storm on October 30. On November 3, it made landfall in Yemen as a very severe cyclonic storm, making it the first tropical cyclone at hurricane intensity to make landfall in the country on record. Chapala rapidly weakened over the mountainous terrain of mainland Yemen and was last noted as a low-pressure area the following day. Chapala caused widespread damage in mainland Yemen, Socotra and the Puntland region of Somalia. High winds, strong waves, and heavy rainfall affected the southern Yemen coast, with areas in the region receiving 610 mm (24 in) of rainfall over 48 hours, or 700% of the average yearly precipitation. The storm caused severe flooding along the coast, including in Mukalla, the nation's fifth largest city, where the seafront was destroyed by waves exceeding 9 m (30 ft). While passing north of Socotra, Chapala brought heavy rainfall and high winds while inundating the northeastern part of the island. Large swells produced by Chapala caused extensive coastal damage in eastern Puntland, with multiple structures, boats, and roads destroyed. An Iranian vessel capsized offshore on November 1, killing one person.

A low-pressure area consolidated into a depression on November 5. It intensified further, prompting the JTWC to issue a TCFA and the IMD to upgrade it into a deep depression. In the following days, the storm's convection flourished as environmental conditions recuperated. By November 8, Megh rapidly intensified into a marginal Extremely Severe Cyclonic Storm, peaking with winds exceeding 175 km/h (110 mph) and a minimum central pressure of 964 mbar (28.47 inHg). Maintaining intensity, the storm made its first landfall over Socotra and headed west, skirting the northern tip of Somalia. Megh took a west-northwestward turn, and made its second landfall over the coast of Yemen on November 10 and weakened into a well-marked low-pressure area over mainland Yemen. Megh's landfall over the island of Socotra as a Category 3-equivalent storm caused extensive devastation, killing at least eighteen people and injuring dozens of others. Another six people were left missing on the island. More than 500 houses were completely destroyed and another 3,000 were damaged. In addition, hundreds of fishing boats were damaged and more than 3,000 families were displaced as a result of Megh.

A low-pressure area consolidated into a depression on November 8. It slowly intensified, prompting the JTWC to issue a Tropical Cyclone Formation Alert (TCFA) for the system, but was eventually cancelled despite the improving appearance prior to landfall. The IMD later upgraded the system to a deep depression before it crossed the coast of Tamil Nadu near Puducherry the following day with peak wind speeds of 55 km/h (35 mph) and a minimum central pressure of 991 hPa (29.26 inHg). Due to land interaction and high vertical wind shear, the system weakened into a well-marked low-pressure area over north Tamil Nadu on November 10. The storm brought heavy rainfall over the coastal districts of Tamil Nadu. Neyveli, a mining township southwest of Puducherry, recorded 139 mm (5.5 in) of rainfall on November 9 and 483 mm (19.0 in) of rainfall on November 10 of which 450 mm (18 in) fell within a span of 9 hours. At least 71 people were killed in various incidents, predominately related to flooding, across Tamil Nadu.

=== South-West Indian Ocean ===
==== January – June ====
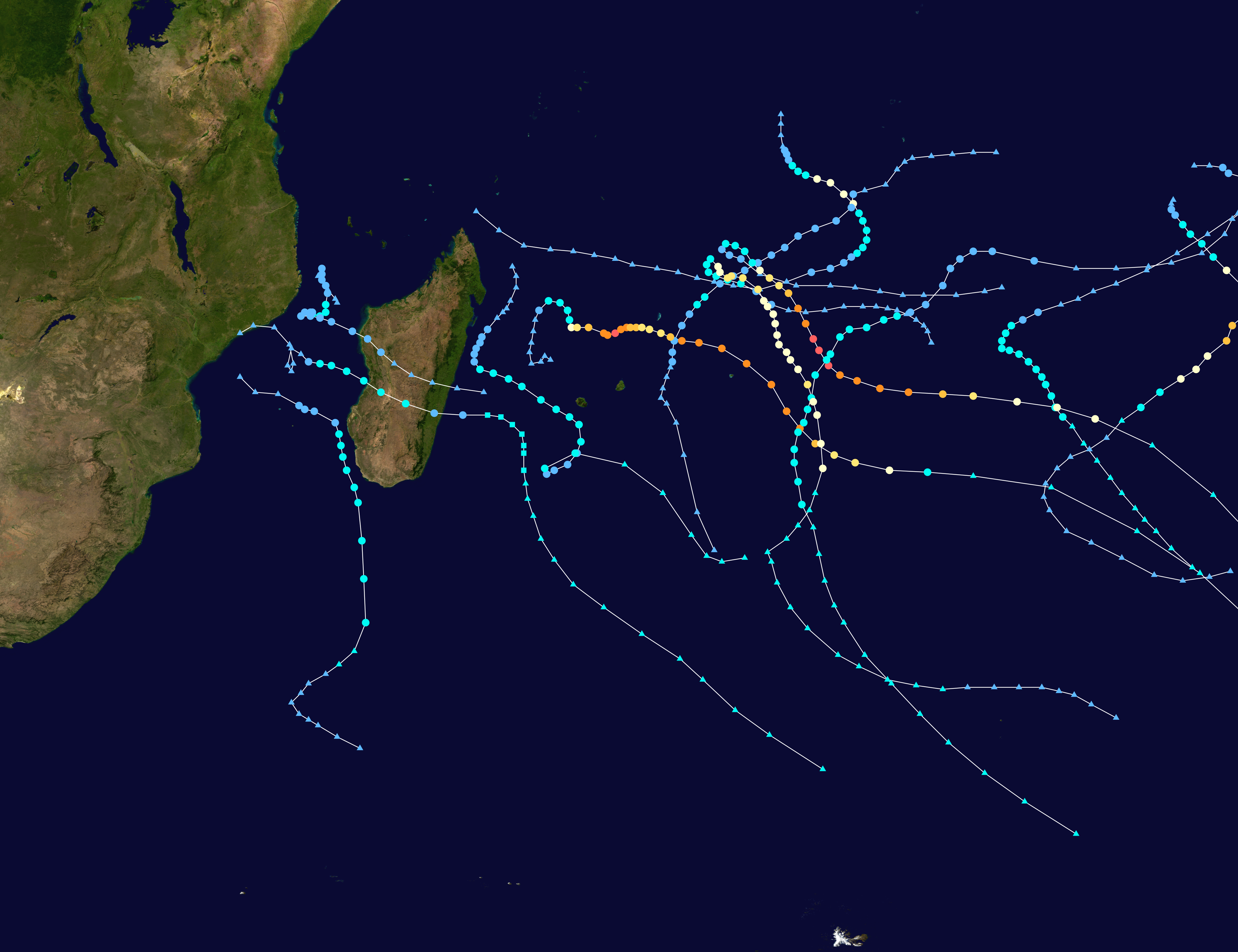
2014–15 South-West Indian Ocean cyclone season

On January 9, the MFR upgraded a low-pressure system east of Madagascar to a zone of disturbed weather, and the system became a tropical disturbance late on the next day. On January 11, the MFR upgraded the system to a tropical depression. Later that day, it intensified into a moderate tropical storm, receiving the name Bansi, whilst the JTWC upgraded it to a tropical storm. In the next day, the MFR upgraded Bansi to a tropical cyclone, as the system formed a ragged eye. On January 13, Bansi explosively intensified into a Category 5 cyclone. However, it soon weakened to a Category 2 on the SSHWS (intense tropical cyclone for MFR) due to an eyewall replacement cycle. It re-intensified slowly to a Category 4 on the SSHWS as it moved East-Southeast until January 13. Then it slowly curved Southeast and impacted Rodrigues on January 14. Approximately 90 percent of the island was left without power as a result of the storm. Some flooding occurred and 115 people sought refuge in shelters. From this moment onwards it started weakening gradually at first, but then deteriorated quickly. On January 16, Bansi began to undergo an extratropical transition. Consequently, the MFR and JTWC issued Bansi's final warning, as Bansi was absorbed by an extratropical cyclone to the northeast.

On January 11, the JTWC started to monitor a weak tropical disturbance inland over Mozambique. On January 14, the MFR upgraded a low-pressure system east of Mozambique to a zone of disturbed weather, and the system became a tropical disturbance late on the same day. On January 15, the MFR upgraded the system to a tropical depression. Later next day, it intensified into a moderate tropical storm, receiving the name Chedza, whilst the JTWC upgraded it to a tropical storm. On the same day, MFR upgraded it to a Severe Tropical Storm. Later that day, it made landfall over Madagascar. On January 17, it left Madagascar and went to the South-West Indian Ocean. On the next day, it re-intensified to a Severe Tropical Storm. On January 19, Chedza began to undergo an extratropical transition. Consequently, the MFR issued Chedza's final warning. The formative stages of Chedza brought rainfall to an already flooded region across southeastern Africa. Weeks of heavy rainfall killed 117 people in Mozambique and 104 in neighboring Malawi, where it was the worst floods in 24 years. In Madagascar, Chedza struck after weeks of heavy rainfall, causing rivers to increase and flooding widespread areas of crop fields. In the capital city of Antananarivo, the deluge damaged the main water pump that controlled water levels in the region. The rainfall caused mudslides and damaged roads. Across the country, flooding from Chedza displaced 54,792 people, after destroying 4,430 houses and flooding another 3,442, mostly in Vatovavy-Fitovinany in the southeastern portion. Chedza killed 80 people and caused about $40 million in damage (2015 USD). Later, the storm brought heavy rainfall and strong winds to the mountainous peaks of Réunion.

On January 26, a tropical low formed east-southeast of Diego Garcia. It slowly moved towards it, before the MFR upgraded the low into a zone of disturbed weather. Later that day, the area of disturbed weather intensified into a depression, as the MFR and JTWC issued their initial advisories, and designated it as 08S. On January 27, MFR reported that Tropical Depression 08S intensified into a moderate tropical storm, and so was issued the name Diamondra. Later that day, Diamondra continued to strengthen, and late on January 28, Diamondra reached moderate tropical storm intensity. Diamondra weakened, after moving over cooler waters. Late on January 29, Diamondra continued to weaken, so JTWC issued Diamondra's final warning. On January 30, Diamondra began to undergo an extratropical transition. Two days later, it was reported that Diamondra had become extratropical, and MFR announced their final advisory on the system soon after.

On January 27, RSMC La Réunion reported that Tropical Disturbance 08, had developed to the northeast of Mauritius. Later that day, the JTWC issued its initial warnings and designated it as 09S. On January 28, MFR reported that Tropical Depression 09S intensified into a moderate tropical storm, as MFR named it Eunice. Then Eunice moved from north to southeast, before Eunice intensified into a severe tropical storm, according to MFR. The JTWC upgraded Eunice into a Category 2 tropical cyclone, while the MFR upgraded Eunice to a tropical cyclone. After a period of rapid intensification, Eunice was classified as a very intense tropical cyclone by the MFR and a Category 5 (1 min 260 kmh)-equivalent tropical cyclone by the JTWC. The next day, Eunice weakened to an intense tropical cyclone as it underwent an eyewall replacement cycle. On February 2, Eunice began to undergo an extratropical transition. One day later, MFR announced their final advisory on the system.

Similar to the formation of Chedza, a weak tropical disturbance developed near shore over southern Mozambique on February 4. On February 5, the MFR upgraded a low-pressure system east of Mozambique to a zone of disturbed weather. On February 6, the MFR upgraded the system to a tropical depression. Later same day, it intensified into a moderate tropical storm, receiving the name Fundi, whilst the JTWC upgraded it to a tropical storm. Fundi weakened, after moving over cooler waters. Late on February 8, Fundi continued to weaken, so JTWC issued Fundi's final warning. On February 9, Fundi began to undergo an extratropical transition. Same day later, it was reported that Fundi had become extratropical, and MFR announced their final advisory on the system soon after. While in its formative stages, the storm brought rainfall to southwestern Madagascar, totaling 109 mm (4.3 in) in Tulear. Severe floods impacted the city of Toliara, killing five people and affecting 1,200 homes. The effects of Fundi in Madagascar worsened the situation in areas still recovering from Severe Tropical Storm Chedza the previous month.

On February 22, a tropical low formed on open seas of the Indian Ocean east of Diego Garcia. It moved westwards, before the MFR upgraded it into a zone of disturbed weather. Then it got upgraded into Tropical Disturbance 10 later. The disturbance continued to move in a westerly direction as the JTWC issued a Tropical Cyclone Formation Alert on the system. On February 24, the system gradually intensified into a tropical depression, whilst the JTWC upgraded it into a tropical storm. However, the MFR upgraded the depression into a moderate tropical storm, which was then named Glenda. It intensified slightly because of favourable conditions for further development, within moderate vertical wind shear. On February 25, the storm continued to intensify, and it reached peak intensity. It quickly weakened the next day, and continued to weaken on February 28, and it lost its energy on March 1. Thereafter, MFR announced their final advisory on the system soon after.

On March 5, the JTWC started issuing advisories on a tropical system over the Mozambique Channel and was designated as 15S. The next day, RSMC La Réunion reported that it had intensified into Tropical Depression 11. On March 7, the system moved in a westward direction and near shore. With this, the MFR downgraded it to a tropical disturbance again on the same day, with the JTWC downgrading it to a tropical depression and issued its final warning. It continued to weaken on the next day, so MFR announced their final advisory on the system soon after.

On March 7, a tropical disturbance formed east of Madagascar. It intensified into a zone of disturbed weather and became a tropical disturbance. It became Tropical Depression 12 by MFR, within the JTWC's designation 16S on March 8, and became Moderate Tropical Storm Haliba. The next day, Haliba continued to intensify. During the early stages of Haliba's development it produced heavy rains across eastern Madagascar, resulting in severe flooding. A total of 26 people died on the island while approximately 96,000 people were affected, 39,000 of whom were rendered homeless. Roughly 13,000 hectares (32,000 acres) of rice fields were destroyed. Torrential rains also affected Mauritius for three days, leading to damaging floods. A 24‑hour rainfall of 135.6 mm (5.34 in) was observed at Ganga Talao. While passing near Réunion, the cyclone produced torrential rain over the northern areas of the island. Total accumulations peaked at 796 mm (31.3 in) in Salazie. Although heavy, the rains were noted as normal for a tropical cyclone. Wind gusts were not as strong as initially forecast and did not exceed 100 km/h (62 mph); a peak gust of 91 km/h (57 mph) was measured in Bellevue Bras Panon. Agricultural damage in the region amounted to €6 million (US$6.4 million).

On April 1, the MFR began to monitor Tropical Disturbance 13 several miles southeast of Diego Garcia. Post-storm analysis determined that it did not develop until April 2. Joalane rapidly intensified into a Tropical Cyclone strength system and reached peak intensity. Afterwards, Joalane kept strength while accelerating southward. Joalane became a remnant low late on April 11. The remnant low continued south until it degenerated to a trough by strong wind shear.

On 6 April, the BoM had reported that Ikola had entered the basin as a severe tropical cyclone from the Southwest Indian Ocean basin and was designated as 19U. Ikola rapidly weakened due to moving into a region of increasing wind shear, becoming a category 3 tropical cyclone by the evening of 7 April. Along with decreasing sea surface temperatures and further increases of wind shear caused Ikola to weaken more to a tropical low on the afternoon of 8 April. The low then proceeded to become a trough system, bringing heavy rainfall to the southwestern parts of Western Australia and severe storms to the southeast of Western Australia. Ikola soaked Central Western Australia and affected Perth from 6–12 April. Ikola was also the first cyclone to move into the Australian basin from the Southwest Indian Ocean basin since Cyclone Alenga in 2011.

==== July – December ====
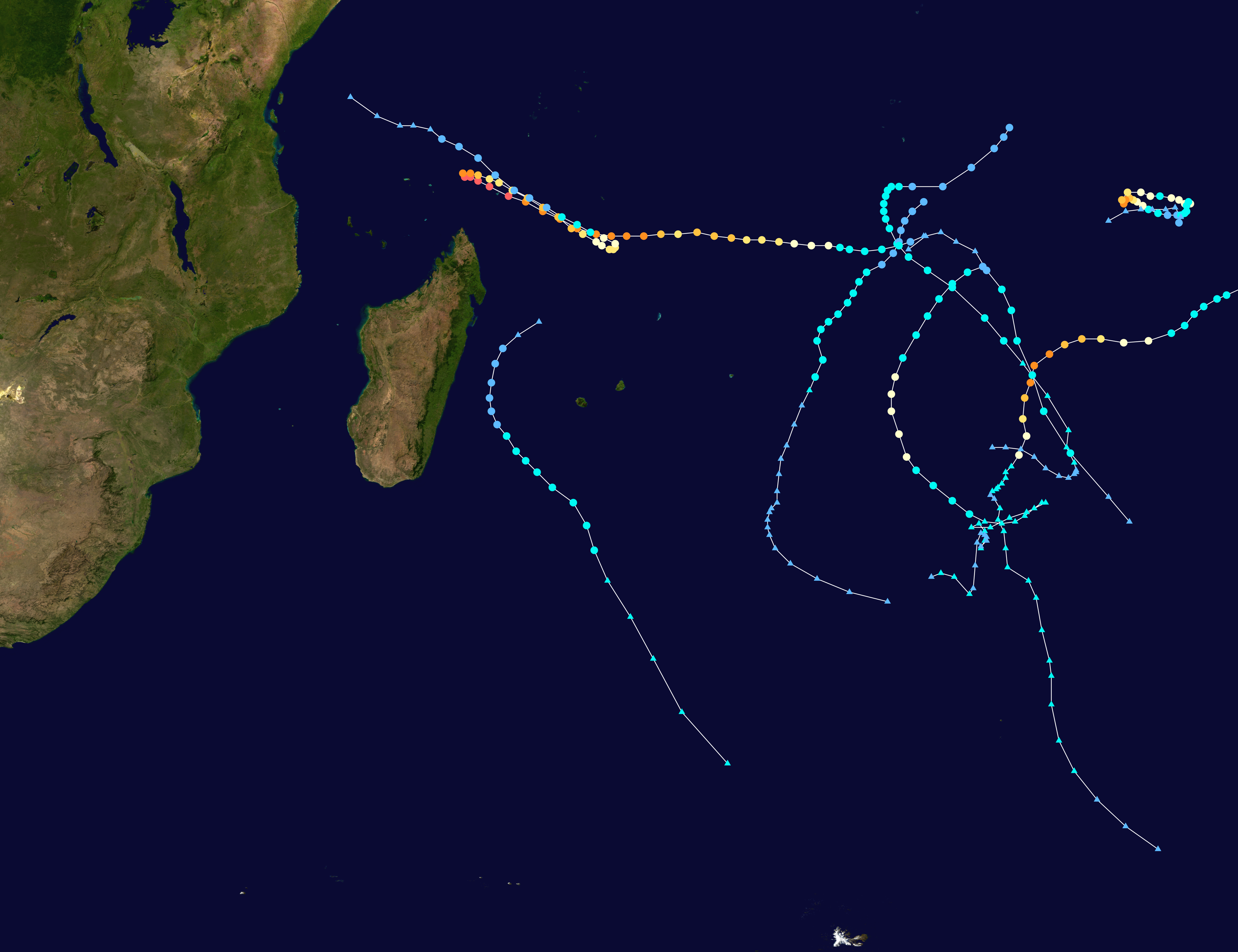
2015–16 South-West Indian Ocean cyclone season

The season started on November 19, with the formation of Annabelle. After a month of inactivity, Bohale formed, but was fairly weak and only reached moderate tropical cyclone strength.

Météo-France first noted a zone of disturbed weather about 930 km (580 mi) east-northeast of Diego Garcia on November 18. It was designated as a tropical disturbance the next day, and upgraded to a tropical depression shortly thereafter. On November 20, the system's organization continued to improve with tight convective banding and it was upgraded to moderate tropical storm status about 270 km (170 mi) south of Diego Garcia. The system was not named Annabelle operationally until early the next day. Annabelle intensified slowly for several days as it drifted south-southeast. The system accelerated to the southeast and developed an eye feature. Annabelle became a severe tropical storm early on November 23, benefiting from strong upper level divergence aloft. Six hours later, Annabelle reached its peak intensity of 100 km/h (60 mph). By November 24, Annabelle's convection became disorganized as a result of increased wind shear induced by an upper level trough and cooler ocean temperatures and it was declared post-tropical. The remnants of Annabelle weakened in the following days until it dissipated during November 27.

On December 3, a disorganized area of convection developed over the equatorial regions of the central Indian Ocean. The system tracked generally southwest until it intensified into Tropical Depression 02 on December 10. The tropical depression gradually turned to the south-southwest and exhibited weak convection, leaving the system exposed as it struggled to intensify within a dry air mass. It received the name Bohale from the Mauritius Meteorological Services early on December 11 when it was operationally determined to have become a moderate tropical storm. In post-season re-analysis, Météo-France determined that Bohale became a tropical storm a day later, on December 12. Bohale maintained its peak intensity of 65 km/h (40 mph) as a moderate tropical storm for 18 hours, before transitioning into a post-tropical depression at 18 UTC while retaining its gale-force winds. The post-tropical remnants of Bohale tracked south slowly until they dissipated on December 16.

=== Australian region ===
==== January – June ====
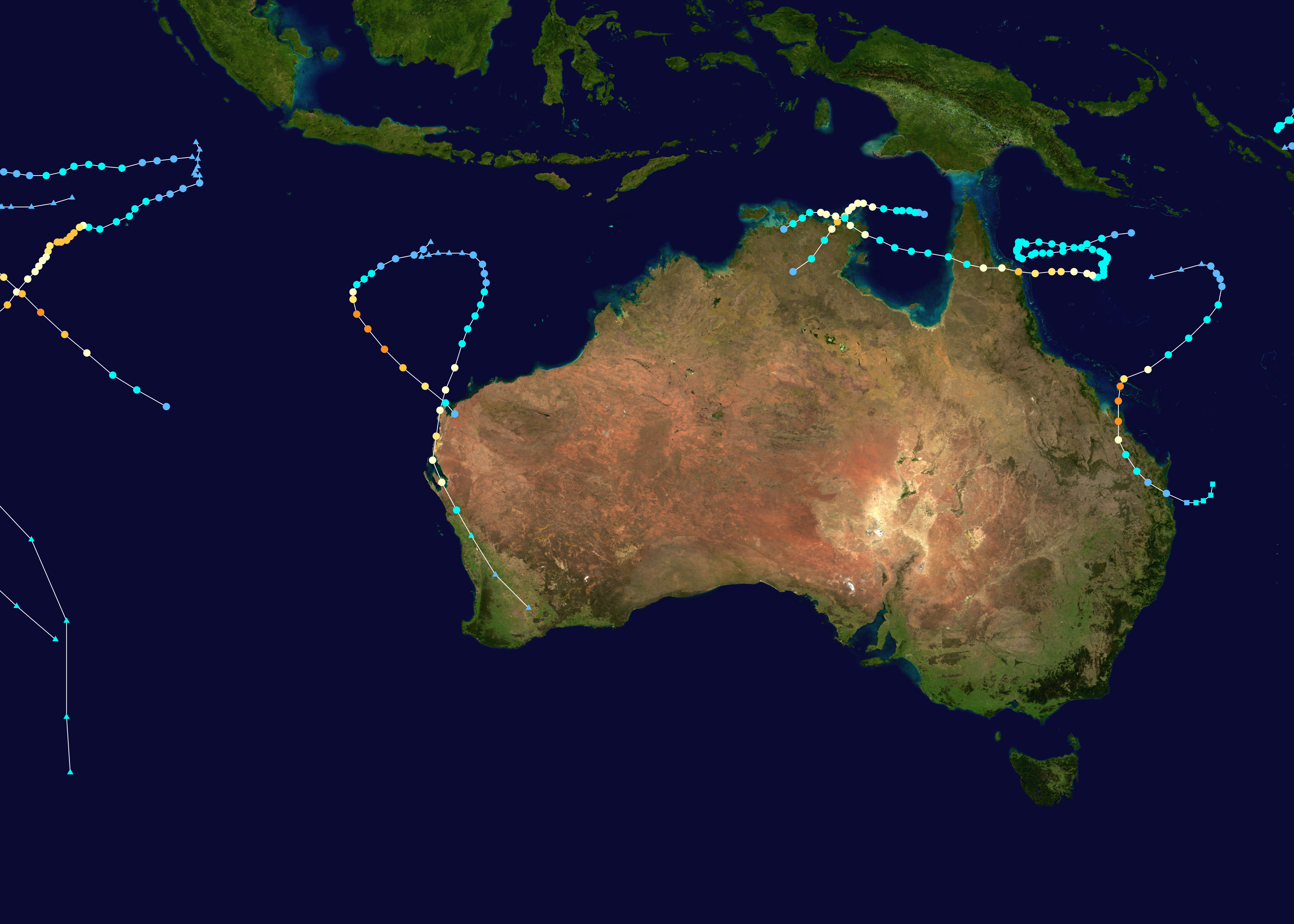
2014–15 Australian region cyclone season summary map

On 2 January, TCWC Perth and Darwin started to monitor Tropical Low 05U, that had developed within the monsoon trough near Wyndham in the Kimberley region of Western Australia. Over the next few days, the low moved slowly towards the southwest and passed to the southeast of Derby during 6 and 7 January. On 8 January, the low began a southward track before tracking to the east on 9 January. During the same day, the low moved south of Fitzroy Crossing and south of Halls Creek later in the evening. The system crossed into the Northern Territory early on 10 January before dissipating later that day. In total, over 1000mm of rain was recorded over inland communities due to 05U.

On 10 January, TCWC Brisbane reported that Tropical Low 06U had developed within the monsoon trough, within an unfavorable environment for further development to the northeast of Queensland. Over the next couple of days, the system moved southeastwards and may have influenced the track of Tropical Low 07U, before it was last noted during 13 January.

During 17 January, a tropical low that had been monitored by the BoM for a few days, moved into the Northern Kimberley region from the Northern Territory. Over the next couple of days, the system moved south-westwards over land before it moved offshore and into the Indian Ocean near Broome during 19 January. As computer models were predicting conditions surrounding the low to be marginally favourable for further development, TCWC Perth expected the system to develop into a tropical cyclone and issued tropical cyclone advice for coastal areas from Kuri Bay to Exmouth. However, as the system spent more time over land than had been forecasted and vertical wind shear did not weaken as much as forecasted. As a result, the system failed to develop into a tropical cyclone as it moved south-westwards towards the Pilbara coast before it dissipated near Port Hedland during 20 January.

Cyclone Lam was the strongest storm to strike Australia's Northern Territory since Cyclone Monica in 2006. It formed from the monsoon trough on 12 February in the Coral Sea. For much of its duration, the system moved westward due to a ridge to the south. The system crossed over the Cape York Peninsula and moved into the Gulf of Carpentaria, whereupon it gradually organized due to warm waters and favorable outflow. On 16 February, the Bureau of Meteorology (BoM) classified it as a Category 1 on the Australian tropical cyclone intensity scale and gave it the name Lam. The storm intensified further while drifting toward the Wessel Islands, developing an eye and strengthening to the equivalence of a minimal hurricane on 18 February. It strengthened to reach maximum sustained winds of 185 km/h (115 mph) early on 19 February before turning to the southwest, making it a Category 4 cyclone. That day, it made landfall on Northern Territory between Milingimbi and Elcho Island at peak intensity, and it rapidly weakened over land. About six hours after Lam moved ashore, Cyclone Marcia struck Queensland as a Category 5 cyclone, marking the first time on record that two storms of Category 4 intensity struck Australia on the same day. In its formative stages, Lam produced heavy rainfall and flooding in Far North Queensland. Later, the cyclone's rainfall set daily precipitation records in Northern Territory. However, the winds caused the most damage, with gusts estimated as high as 230 km/h (145 mph). The highest gust was 170 km/h (105 mph) at Cape Wessel on Rimbija Island. Lam caused considerable destruction, particularly affecting local aboriginal communities. Total damage in the Northern Territory reached at least A$82.4 million (US$64.3 million).

On 16 February, the BoM started to monitor a weak tropical disturbance in the Coral Sea. It quickly developed into a Category 1 tropical cyclone on 18 February, earning the name Marcia. It was upgraded to Category 2 the following day when it was approximately 555 kilometres (345 mi) north of Bundaberg and again upgraded to Category 3 severe tropical cyclone when approximately 290 kilometres (180 mi) north of Yeppoon. On 19 February, due to a developing, clear eye, the JTWC upgraded Marcia to a Category 2 whilst the BoM upgraded it as a Category 4. Due to explosive intensification, Marcia became a Category 5 according to the BoM early on 20 February. It affected Queensland, and last noted on 26th of the same month as it dissipated, west-southwest of New Caledonia. The boat of two fishermen traveling to Fraser Island sank due to rough seas on the morning of 19 February, however, they were found safe and well on nearby Moon Boom Island the next morning. The storm wrought extensive damage in Queensland, with losses amounting to A$750 million (US$590.5 million).

On 8 March, the BoM started to monitor a weak tropical low over Western Australia. The system was later designated as 16U a few days later. Due to an increase in convection, both the BoM and JTWC upgraded the system to a Category 1 tropical cyclone, naming it Olwyn on 11 March. Just before 12 March, Olwyn rapidly developed a ragged eye, as the BoM upgraded the system to a Category 3 severe tropical cyclone. Early on 13 March, Olwyn reached its peak strength of 140 km/h (87 mph) as the JTWC classified it as a Category 2 cyclone. However, after a few hours, the JTWC downgraded it to a Category 1 cyclone as it weakened from land interaction. On the same day, Olwyn made landfall over southwestern Australia as a weakening cyclone. Rapidly weakening inland, it emerged on the Southern Ocean as a decaying remnant low. It dissipated onwards. Olwyn caused extensive damage along the coast of Western Australia, from Onslow to Kalbarri. In preparation for the storm, the Pilbara Ports authority closed the ports of Dampier and Ashburton. The entire workforce on Barrow Island was evacuated to the island's cyclone shelter. 128 km/h (80 mph) wind gusts and 141.6 mm (5.57 in) of rain was recorded on the island as it was brushed by Olwyn. Upon landfall, a maximum wind gust of 180 km/h (110 mph) was recorded at Learmonth. Moderate property damage occurred at nearby Exmouth, with several houses being inundated with floodwater after 141.8 mm (5.58 in) of rain fell in 24 hours. Trees were uprooted and power was cut for several days. The Exmouth Yacht Club sustained heavy damage from Olwyn's storm surge. Damage was more severe further south at Carnarvon where most houses are not built to cyclone standards, unlike in Exmouth. Olwyn passed over the town at category 3 status, unroofing and severely damaging multiple houses, while many sheds and outbuildings were totally destroyed. The town's water and power facilities were damaged, leaving the area without water and electricity supplies for days. The entire banana crop in the Carnarvon area was destroyed by the storm's high winds and flooding. The Gascoyne River experienced its most severe flood since 2010 due to rains from Olwyn. One person sustained life-threatening injuries in a storm-related car accident, he was later on pronounced dead when he died in hospital from his injuries. Total damage in Carnarvon was estimated to be in excess of A$100 million (US$76.3 million), and Olwyn has been noted as the most severe cyclone to have hit the town since 1950. A total of 121.8 mm (4.80 in) of rain fell in 24 hours at Shark Bay from Olwyn, setting a record for the highest amount of rainfall recorded in March at what is normally the most arid place on the Australian coast. Minor property and tree damage occurred in Denham. Further south, 8 mm (0.31 in) of rain and 76 km/h (47 mph) wind gusts were reported in Geraldton. The remnant low of Olwyn caused 15–25 mm (0.59–0.98 in) of rain across the Wheatbelt, which was beneficial for farmers in the area. Perth recorded 12.8 mm (0.50 in) of rain and cooler temperatures as Olwyn's remnants moved into the Southern Ocean. On 15 March Olwyn's remnants brought severe storms to the Southern Western Australia. Olwyn was the first ex-tropical cyclone to affect Geraldton, the Wheatbelt region and Perth since Cyclone Iggy in 2012.

Shortly after Cyclone Pam was classified on the South Pacific, the outer rainbands of Pam led to the formation of a tropical low near Australia on 9 March. Later that day, the BoM designated the system as 17U and intensified into Tropical Cyclone Nathan several hours later. It slowly executed a cyclonic loop over the next few days, moving across Arnhem Land. After intensifying to an initial peak intensity of 165 km/h (105 mph), Nathan weakened while crossing the Cape York Peninsula and reintensified over the Gulf of Carpentaria. It impacted Arnhem Land as an equivalent of a Category 1 cyclone, before hitting Darwin, Northern Territory the same day. It dissipated afterwards. The remnants of Nathan brought 106 mm (4.2 in) of rainfall to Onslow, Western Australia on 30 March. Cyclone Nathan hit the Arnhem Land one month after Cyclone Lam. Total damage in northern Queensland were about A$74.8 million (US$57 million).

On 6 April, the BoM had reported that Ikola had entered the basin as a severe tropical cyclone from the Southwest Indian Ocean basin and was designated as 19U. Ikola rapidly weakened due to moving into a region of increasing wind shear, becoming a category 3 tropical cyclone by the evening of 7 April. Along with decreasing sea surface temperatures and further increases of wind shear caused Ikola to weaken more to a tropical low on the afternoon of 8 April. The low then proceeded to become a trough system, bringing heavy rainfall to the southwestern parts of Western Australia and severe storms to the southeast of Western Australia. Ikola soaked Central Western Australia and affected Perth from 6–12 April. Ikola was also the first cyclone to move into the Australian basin from the Southwest Indian Ocean basin since Cyclone Alenga in 2011.

On 27 April, the BoM started to monitor a tropical low over Western Australia that had formed from a monsoon trough. Later that day, the system gradually intensified as it was designated as 21U. The next day, 21U intensified into Tropical Cyclone Quang. Quang proceeded to intensify rapidly during 29 and 30 April, reaching a maximum intensity of a category 4 severe tropical cyclone. Quang was located 600 km northwest of the North West Cape region before turning in a southeast direction. Quang moved southeast during 1 May while rapidly weakening due to an increase of wind shear, disrupting the cyclones structure in the process. Quang was downgraded to a category 3 severe tropical cyclone in the morning of 1 May and continued to weaken during the course of the day, becoming a Category 1 before making landfall near the Exmouth coast on the night of 1 May and quickly weakened to a tropical low after it hit Exmouth. It dissipated thereafter. Quang did minimal damage to Exmouth, Western Australia.

Late on 30 June, Tropical Depression 17F moved into the Australian region from the South Pacific and intensified gradually into Tropical Cyclone Raquel. After drifting for the next two days, it exited the basin, moving back into the South Pacific. However, Raquel re-entered the basin early on 4 July as a weakening depression. The next day, Raquel was declared a remnant low. According to the Bureau of Meteorology, it is the only known instance of a tropical cyclone during July in the region since the satellite era began (since at least 1970). As a byproduct of becoming a tropical cyclone on the first day of the new cyclone year, it marked the earliest start to a season in the basin on record.

==== July – December ====
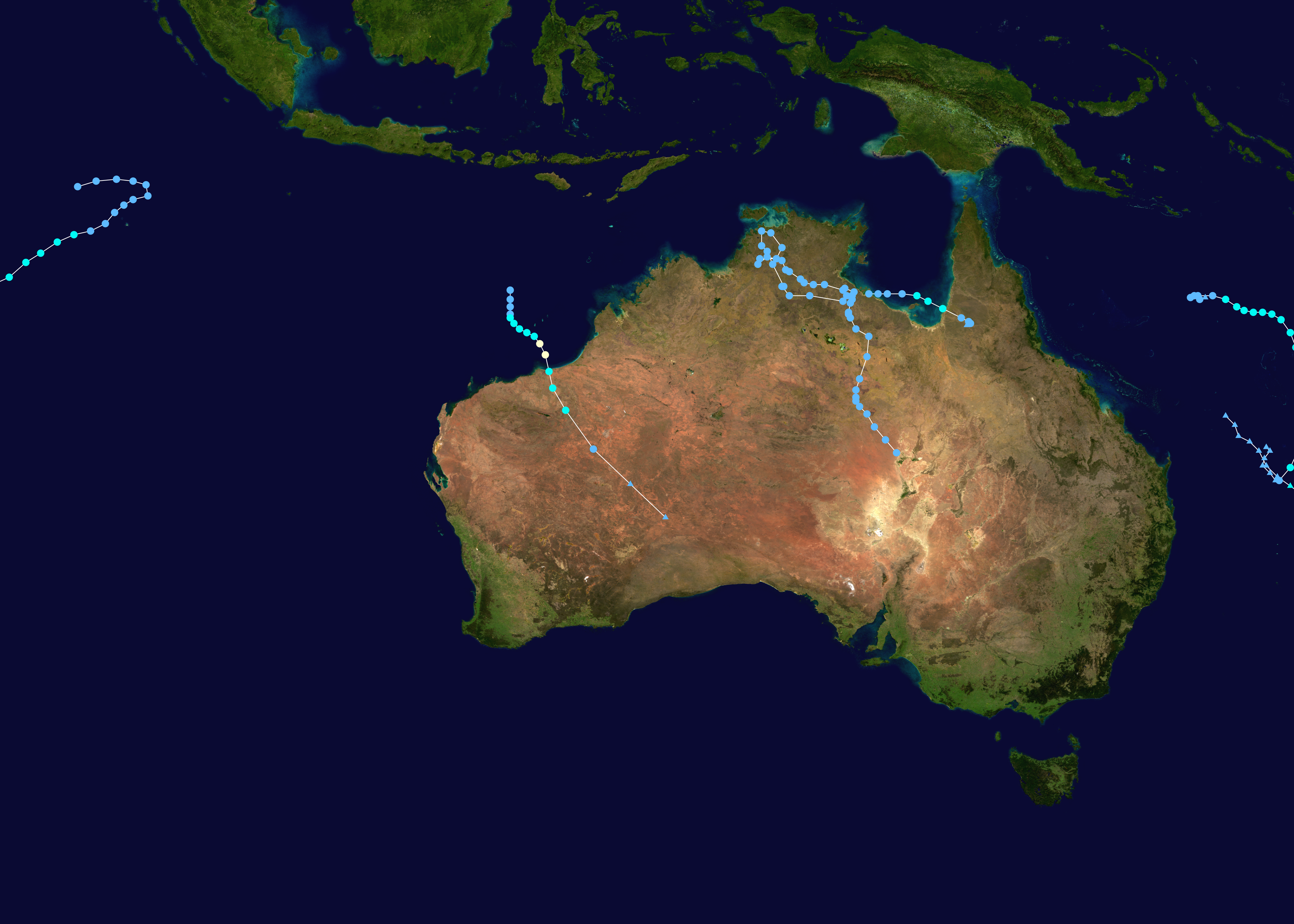
2015–16 Australian region cyclone season summary map

On 16 December, TCWC Perth mentioned that a tropical low may develop northwest of Christmas Island. The agency declared to be a tropical low by the next day when it was producing convection in its area. On 20 December, TCWC Jakarta issued an advisory as the low was inside their area of responsibility, as it was located about 567 km (352 mi) south-southwest of Tanjung Karang. TCWC Perth forecast the low would intensify to a tropical cyclone and move into the Western Region by 24 hours on 21 December. The low was later designated as 04U on 23 December, however, this was the last advisory issued by TCWC Perth and rapidly dissipated overnight.

Tropical Low 05U developed over land near Borroloola in the Northern Territory during 21 December. Over the next couple of days, the system gradually deepened further as it moved west-northwest inland and passed near Daly Waters and Katherine. The system subsequently approached Darwin during 24 December, where it was causing near gale-force winds offshore. On 26 December, 05U was embedded within a monsoon, giving a potential of intensifying into a tropical cyclone. A couple of days later, 05U drifted southeastwards towards land and failed to reach tropical cyclone intensity. The system was last noted on 2 January while it was located over the Simpson Desert in Queensland, as it was not clear if the low continued towards the east coast or another system had developed.

A low-pressure developed east of the 90th meridian east or the border of the basin on 26 December, and had a moderate chance of intensifying into a tropical cyclone. TCWC Perth later classified it as a weak tropical low with the identifier of 06U. On 28 December, as the low slowly moved south, unfavorable environments hinder the chance of being a cyclone. TCWC Perth made its final bulletin of the tropical low as it slowly drifted west on 29 December.

=== South Pacific Ocean ===
==== January – June ====
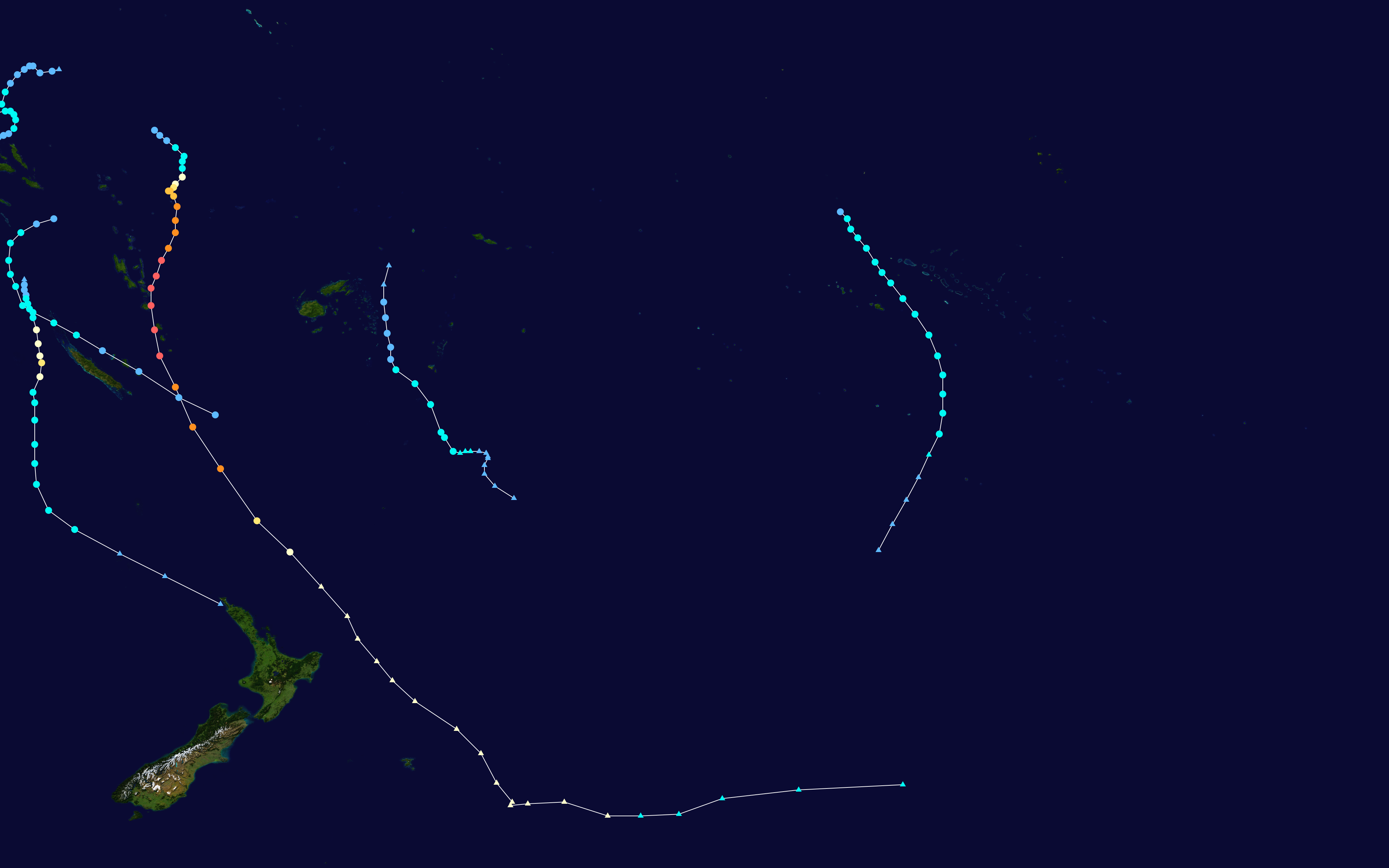
2014–15 South Pacific cyclone season summary map

During January 19, RSMC Nadi reported that Tropical Disturbance 06F had developed, to the northeast of Papeete on the French Polynesian island of Tahiti. The system lay under an upper-level ridge of high pressure in an environment, which was favorable for further development with low to moderate vertical windshear. As a result, the organisation of the atmospheric convection surrounding the system significantly improved, while the systems low level circulation centre rapidly consolidated over the next day. As a result, late on January 20, the JTWC initiated advisories on the system an assigned it the designation 07P. RSMC Nadi subsequently reported that the system had developed into a category 1 tropical cyclone and named it Niko. Over the next two days the system gradually intensified further and became a category 2 tropical cyclone early on January 22. It was downgraded to a depression on 24 January. On January 25, Niko completed its extratropical transition.

Late on January 27, RSMC Nadi reported that Tropical Disturbance 08F had developed about 275 km (170 mi) to the southeast of Apia, Samoa.

During January 29, RSMC Nadi reported that Tropical Depression 09F had moved into the basin, from the Australian region to the northwest of New Caledonia. The system was moving towards the east-northeast and lay within an area of low vertical wind shear underneath an upper-level ridge of high pressure. During January 30 the JTWC initiated advisories on the system and assigned it the designation Tropical Cyclone 10P. RSMC Nadi subsequently reported that the system had become a category 1 tropical cyclone and named it Ola. Over the next two days the system gradually intensified further and became a category 3 severe tropical cyclone early on February 1.

On February 2, RSMC Nadi reported that Tropical Disturbance 10F had developed about 680 km (425 mi) to the northeast of Suva, Fiji. Over the next day the system moved south-eastwards in an area of low to moderate vertical windshear, before it was last noted during February 4, after the low level circulation centre had become exposed. Tropical Disturbance 13F developed within an area of low vertical windshear, to the north of the island of Papeete on the French Polynesian island of Tahiti during March 19. Over the next few days the system moved westwards and remained poorly organised, with atmospheric convection persistent over the systems supposed low level circulation centre. The system was subsequently last noted during March 21, while it was located to the north of Rarotonga in the Southern Cook Islands. During April 15, RSMC Nadi reported that Tropical Depression 16F, had developed about 450 km (280 mi) to the northwest of Port Vila, Vanuatu. During that day the system moved westwards and was last noted as it moved into the Australian region during April 16. During May 12, the BoM started to monitor a westward-moving tropical low that had developed near the Solomon Islands, before it moved out of the basin during the next day.

During March 6, RSMC Nadi reported that Tropical Disturbance 11F had developed about 1,140 km (710 mi) to the northwest of Nadi, Fiji. The disturbance continued on its southwestward track until two days later, when the RSMC had upgraded it to a tropical depression. The JTWC issued a Tropical Cyclone Formation Alert (TCFA). Cyclone Pam developed out of this system on March 9, when RSMC Nadi started tracking it as a Category 1 tropical cyclone. Located in an area of favourable conditions, Pam gradually intensified into a powerful Category 5 severe tropical cyclone by March 12. Pam's ten-minute maximum sustained winds peaked at 250 km/h (155 mph), along with a minimum pressure of 896 hPa, making Pam the most intense tropical cyclone of the basin since Zoe in 2002. Several hours later, the cyclone began to curve towards the south-southeast, allowing Pam to pass just east of Efate, becoming the single worst natural disaster in the history of Vanuatu. The cyclone crippled Vanuatu's infrastructure: an estimated 90 percent of the nation's buildings were impacted by the storm's effects, telecommunications were paralyzed, and water shortages took place. The FMS estimated Pam as having record-breaking 250 km/h (155 mph) ten-minute sustained winds. The storm's winds gradually slowed afterwards as Pam tracked west of Tafea. However, the FMS indicated that the cyclone's pressure dropped further to a minimum of 896 mbar (hPa; 26.46 inHg) on March 14. Pam left the FMS area of responsibility as it progressed along its path, the storm's eye faded away and Pam's low level circulation became displaced from its associated thunderstorms, signalling a rapid weakening phase. Later on March 15, both agencies discontinued issuing advisories as Pam entered a phase of extratropical transition while affecting northeastern New Zealand.

On March 19, RSMC Nadi had reported that Tropical Disturbance 12F had developed about 375 km (235 mi) to the southwest of Apia on the Samoan island of Upolu. The system moved southwards as it was classified as a tropical depression. On March 21, the JTWC classified 12F as a tropical storm, giving the designation 20P. Early on March 22, RSMC Nadi reported that the system had developed into a category 1 tropical cyclone and named it Reuben, while it was located about 220 km (135 mi) to the south of Nukuʻalofa, Tonga. Early on March 23, both agencies discontinued issuing advisories as Reuben entered a phase of extratropical transition. Between March 20–22, Reuben's precursor tropical depression produced heavy rain and strong winds over Fiji's Lau Islands.

The depression was last noted by the FMS during March 31, while it was located about 600 km (375 mi) to the southeast of Rarotonga in the Cook Islands.

Tropical Depression 15F developed within the monsoon trough during April 9, about 465 km (290 mi) to the south of Honiara in the Solomon Islands. The system was located under an upper-level ridge of high pressure and in a region favouring further development, including low vertical wind shear and sea surface temperatures of above 30 °C (86 °F). As a result, the system rapidly developed during that day as it moved southwards, with atmospheric convection wrapping into the systems low level circulation centre. During the next day the JTWC initiated advisories on the system and classified it as Tropical Cyclone 23P, while the FMS reported that the system had developed into a Category 1 tropical cyclone and named it Solo. The system continued to intensify during that day, before both the JTWC and the FMS reported that Solo had peaked with winds of 100 km/h (60 mph) during April 11, which made it a category 2 tropical cyclone on the Australian scale. Turning to the south-southeast, Solo entered an area of strong vertical wind shear and subsequently weakened. During April 12, Solo passed about 50 km (30 mi) to the northeast of the Belep Islands, as it moved between New Caledonia's mainland and the Loyalty Islands. Solo was subsequently declassified as a tropical cyclone later that day, after it had lost the characteristics of a tropical cyclone. Within the Solomon Islands, the Makira – Ereteria river was flooded during April 7, while flash flooding destroyed food gardens, bananas and cocoa beans. As it impacted New Caledonia, Solo caused wind gusts of up to 100 km/h (62 mph), while rainfall totals of up to 222 mm (8.7 in) were recorded in New Caledonia. As an indirect effect of Solo significant damage was recorded in New Caledonia, with road impassable in places and the drinking water deteriorated in the municipality of Pouébo.

After the season had ended, researchers identified that a possible subtropical or tropical cyclone, had existed to the northeast of Easter Island between April 29 – May 4 and unofficially named it Katie. The system originated within a frontal zone during the later part of April, before it developed into a nonfrontal system during April 29. At this time the majority of atmospheric convection associated with the system was located to the southeast of its low level circulation centre. Over the next couple of days, the system moved south-eastwards and gradually developed further because it was an El nino year and before it developed into a subtropical storm during May 1. The system subsequently moved north-westwards and degenerated into a remnant low on May 4, before it dissipated during May 6. It was unofficially named due to it forming in an area that is not warm enough to support tropical cyclone formation.

==== July – December ====
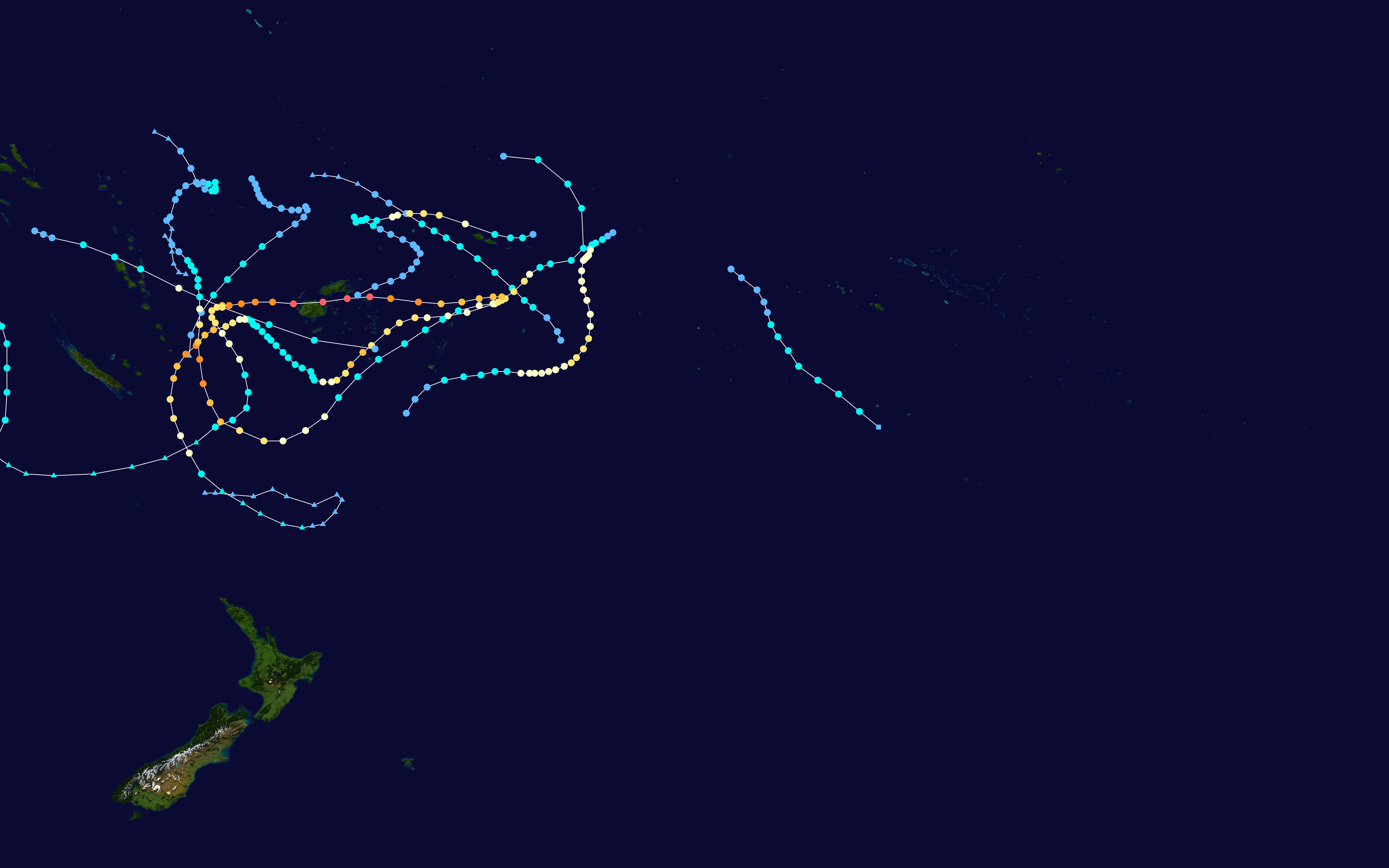
2015–16 South Pacific cyclone season summary map

The first tropical depression of the season was first noted as a tropical disturbance during July 29, while it was located about 920 km (570 mi) to the north-northeast of Honiara in the Solomon Islands. The system lay to the north of an upper level subtropical ridge of high pressure in an area of moderate vertical wind shear. Over the next couple of days the system slowly organised further as it steered south-eastwards into an area of decreasing vertical wind shear. As a result of further organization it was classified as a tropical depression during August 1. Late on August 4, the FMS issued its final advisory on the system as it reported that the system was not expected to develop.

During October 12, Tropical Disturbance 02F developed along the South Pacific convergence zone, while it was located about 450 km (280 mi) to the northwest of Rotuma. The system was located within a favourable environment for further development, with low to moderate vertical wind shear, and it lay under an upper-level ridge of high pressure. Despite all of this, the system dissipated on October 18.

On November 23, Tropical Disturbance 03F developed within a trough of low pressure, about 500 km (310 mi) to the northeast of Suva, Fiji. The system lay in an area of low to moderate vertical wind shear, to the south of an upper-level ridge of high pressure. Across American Samoa, Tuni produced strong winds and heavy rains. Sustained winds of 90 km/h (56 mph) were observed in Tututila at an elevated location. Some trees were uprooted. Plantations, shacks, and garages sustained damage with total losses amounting to US$5 million. There was no significant damage recorded in Niue, as the system brushed the island nation.

Tropical Disturbance 04F was first noted on December 1, while it was located about 640 km (400 mi) to the northeast of Papeete in French Polynesia. Over the next day the poorly organised system moved westwards, underneath an upper-level ridge of high pressure before it dissipated during December 2. During December 27, Tropical Disturbance 06F developed to the north of Wallis Island, in an area of moderate to high vertical wind shear.

In late December 2015, a long-lived and powerful westerly wind burst triggered the formation of a tropical disturbance in the south Pacific, along with its twin in the central North Pacific, which became Tropical Depression Nine-C. During December 26, Tropical Disturbance 05F developed within a monsoon trough, about 465 km (290 mi) to the south-east of the Honiara in the Solomon Islands. The system lay under an upper level ridge of high pressure in an area of moderate to high vertical wind shear. Over the next few days the system moved eastwards and gradually developed further, becoming a tropical depression during December 29, while it was located to the north of the Samoan Islands.

=== South Atlantic Ocean ===
On 5 February 2015, a subtropical depression developed about 105 nautical miles (195 km; 120 mi) to the southeast of São Paulo, Brazil. During the next day, low-level baroclincity decreased around the system, as it moved southeastwards away from the Brazilian coast and intensified further. The system was named Bapo by the Brazilian Navy Hydrography Center during 6 February, after it had intensified into a subtropical storm. Over the next couple of days the system continued to move south-eastwards before it transitioned into an extratropical cyclone during 8 February.

On 10 March 2015, the Hydrographic Center of the Brazilian Navy began issuing warnings on Subtropical Depression 3 during early afternoon, while the Center for Weather Forecast and Climatic Studies (CPTEC in Portuguese) already assigned the name Cari for the storm. At 00:00 UTC on 11 March, the Hydrographic Center of the Brazilian Navy upgraded Cari to a subtropical storm, also assigning a name to it. On 12 March, the Brazilian Hydrographic Center downgraded Cari to a subtropical depression, while the CPTEC stated that the storm had become a "Hybrid cyclone". During early afternoon of 13 March, the Brazilian Navy declared that Cari became a remnant low. Cari brought heavy rainfall, flooding and landslides to eastern cities of Santa Catarina and Rio Grande do Sul states. Rain totals from 100 to 180 mm (3.9 to 7.1 in) were observed associated with the storms and wind topped 75 km/h (47 mph) in Cabo de Santa Marta. A Navy buoy registered a 6-metre (20 ft) wave off the coast of Santa Catarina.

== Systems ==
=== January ===
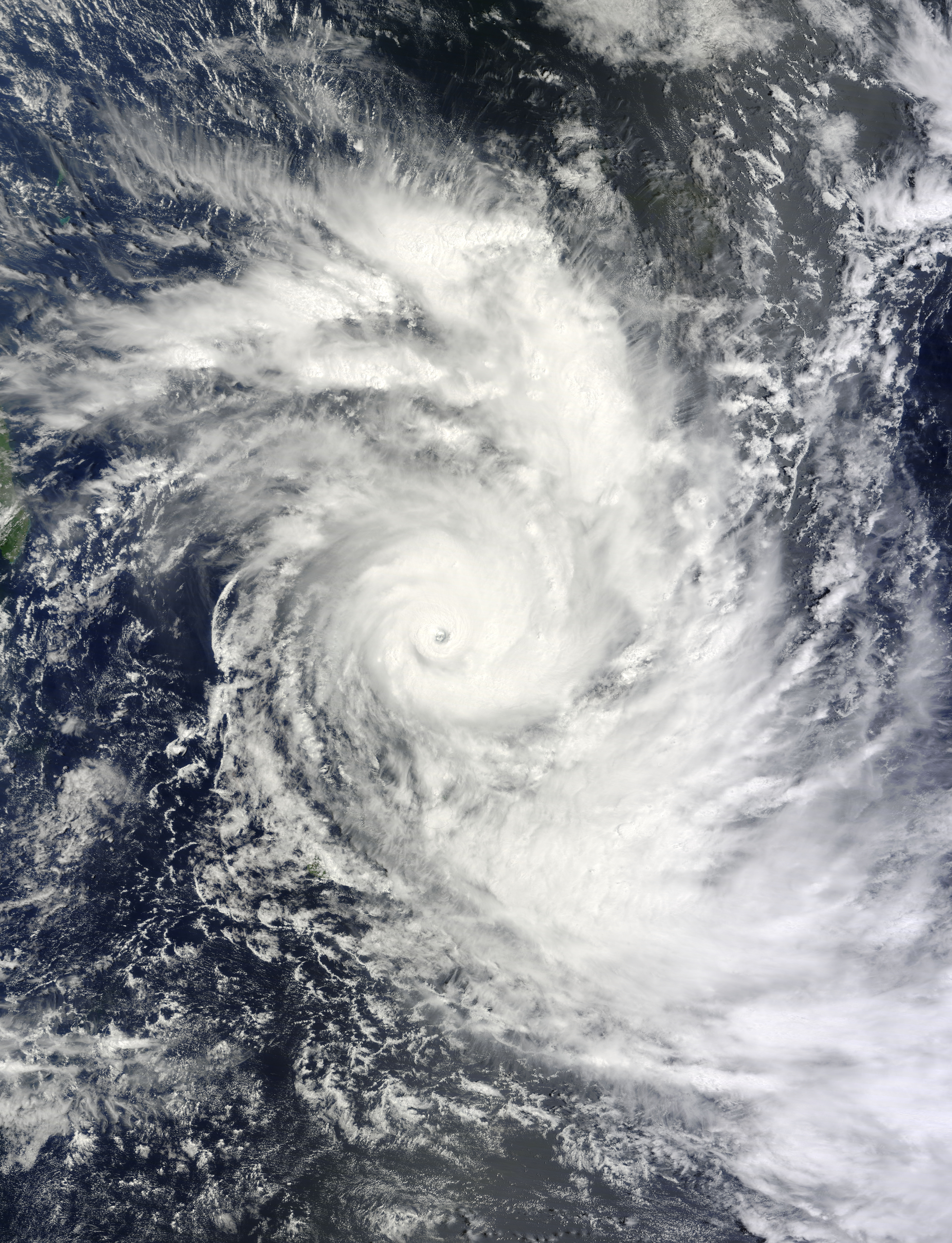
Cyclone Bansi

January was very active, with fourteen storms forming, seven receiving a name. The month kicked off in the Australian basin with the formation of 05U, 06U, 07U, and 08U. However, no storms have been named. In the southern pacific, cyclones Niko and Ola formed, as well as an additional disturbance. Niko impacted French Polynesia and Ola impacted New Caledonia and Australia's Lord Howe Island. A subtropical depression formed in the South Atlantic on January 23. In the South-West Indian Ocean, Cyclones Bansi and Eunice, as well as Tropical Storms Chedza and Diamondra formed, with Bansi and Eunice becoming Very Intense Tropical Cyclones, with Bansi impacting the Mascarene Islands. In the Western Pacific, Tropical Storm Mekkhala formed, and impacted Yap State and the Philippines. An additional depression also formed.

Tropical cyclones formed in January 2015
Storm name	Dates active	Max wind km/h (mph)	Pressure (hPa)	Areas affected	Damage (USD)	Deaths	Refs
05U	January 2–10	55 (35)	994	Western Australia	Minimal	None	
TD	January 2–4	Unspecified	1006	Borneo	None	None	
Bansi	January 10–18	220 (140)	910	Mascarene Islands	Minimal	None	
06U	January 10–13	Unspecified	Unspecified	None	None	None	
07U	January 10–13	55 (35)	998	Solomon Islands	None	None	
Mekkhala (Amang)	January 13–21	110 (70)	975	Yap State, Philippines	$7.8 million	3	
Chedza	January 14–19	110 (65)	975	Zimbabwe, Malawi, Mozambique, Madagascar, Réunion	$40 million	80	
08U	January 16–20	30 (15)	1003	Western Australia	None	None	
Niko	January 19–25	100 (65)	982	French Polynesia	Minimal	None	
#01-2015	January 23–24	55 (35)	1008	Brazil	Unknown	None	
Diamondra	January 26–30	85 (50)	986	None	None	None	
Eunice	January 26 – February 1	230 (145)	915	None	None	None	
08F	January 27–30	Unspecified	1000	Wallis and Futuna, Samoan Islands	None	None	
Ola	January 29 – February 3	150 (90)	955	New Caledonia, Lord Howe Island	None	None	

=== February ===
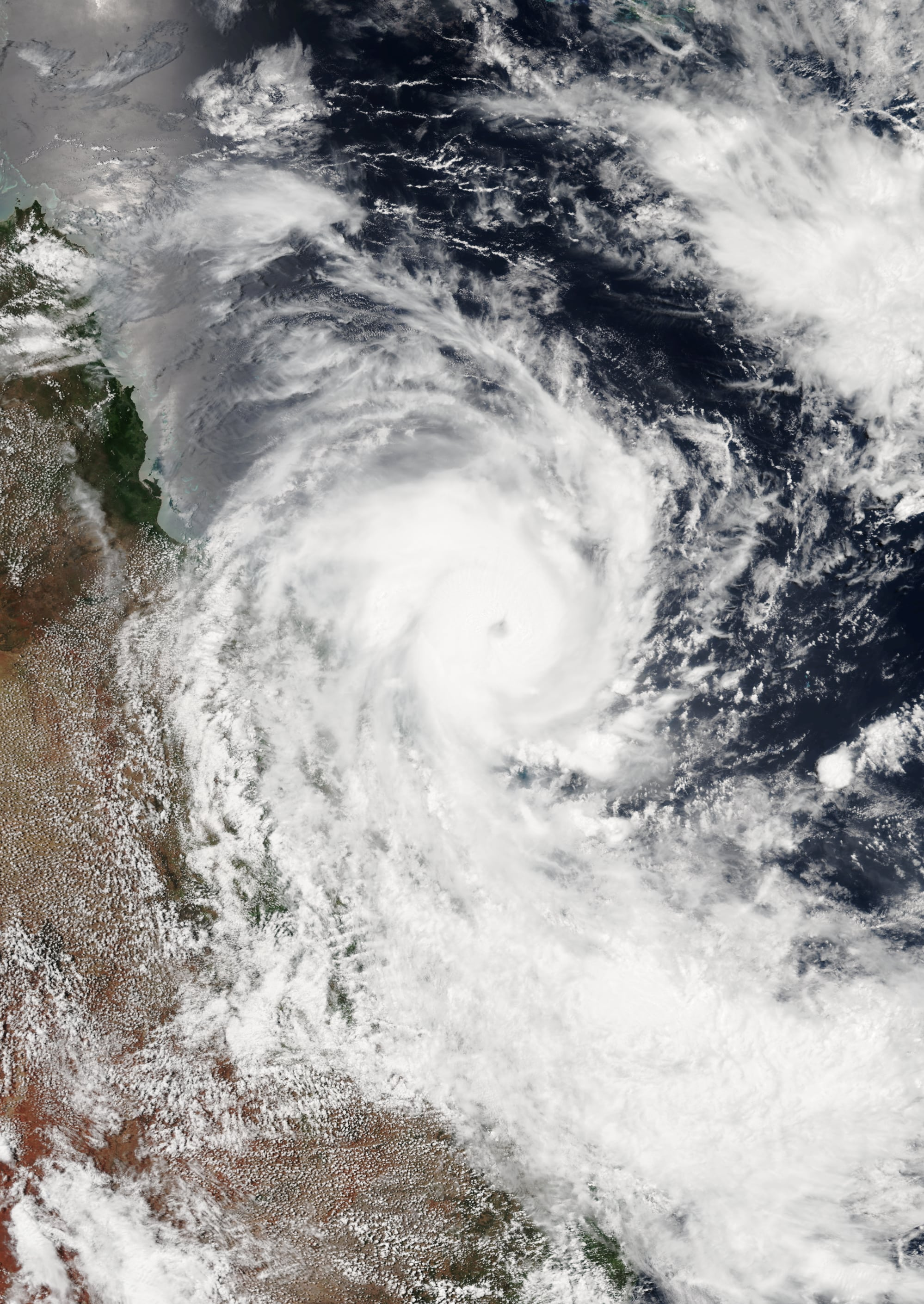
Cyclone Marcia

Tropical cyclones formed in February 2015
Storm name	Dates active	Max wind km/h (mph)	Min pressure (mbar)	Areas affected	Damage (USD)	Deaths	Refs
10F	February 2–4	Unspecified	1001	Tuvalu	None	None	
Fundi	February 5–8	100 (65)	978	Madagascar	Unknown	5	
Bapo	February 5–8	65 (40)	992	None	None	None	
Higos	February 6–12	165 (105)	940	None	None	None	
12U	February 13–16	Unspecified	Unspecified	None	None	None	
Lam	February 13–20	185 (115)	943	Queensland, Northern Territory, Western Australia	$64.4 million	None	
Marcia	February 15–26	205 (125)	930	Queensland	$591 million	None	
Glenda	February 22–28	95 (60)	974	None	None	None	

=== March ===
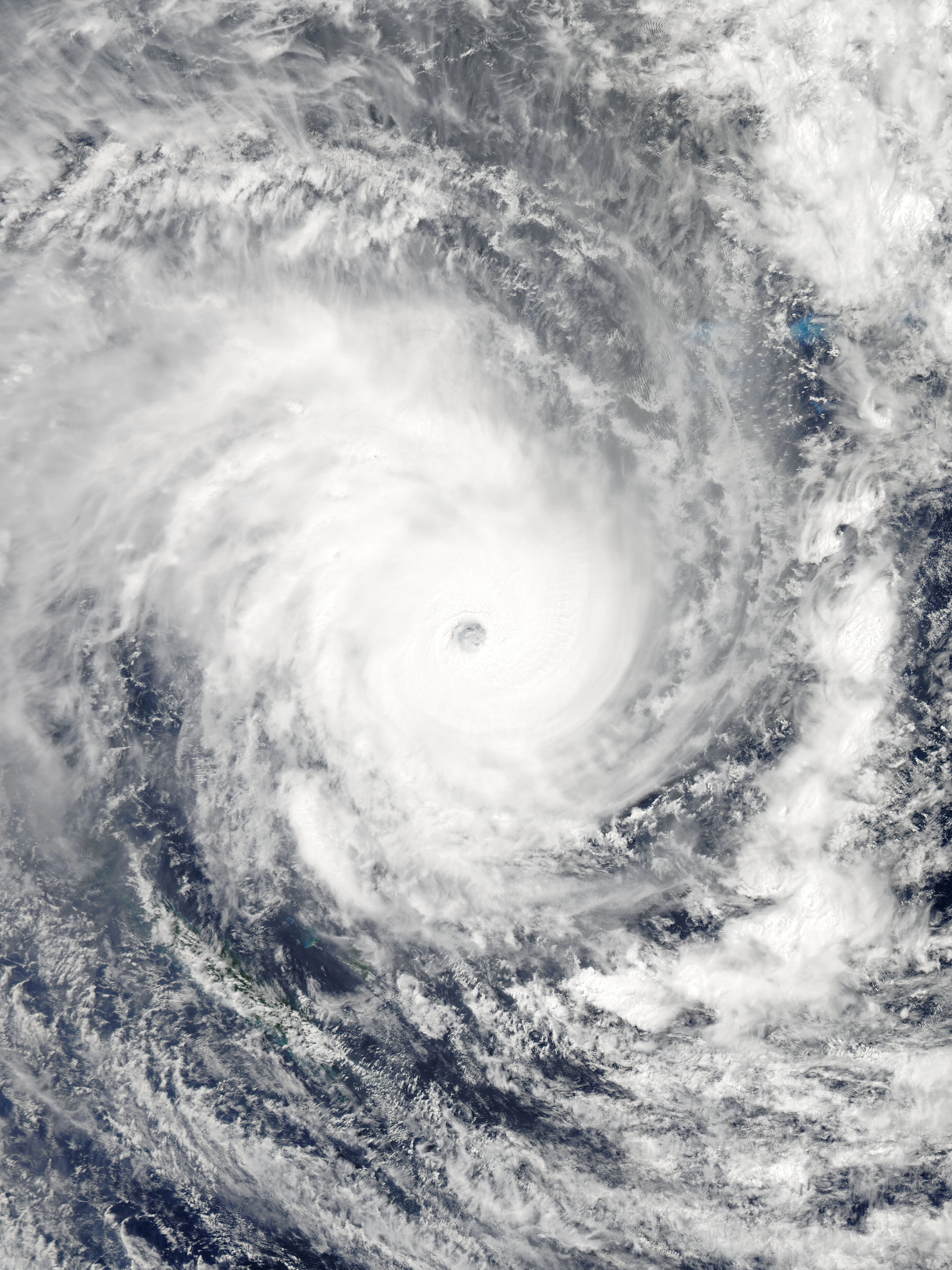
Cyclone Pam

Tropical cyclones formed in March 2015
Storm name	Dates active	Max wind km/h (mph)	Min pressure (mbar)	Areas affected	Damage (USD)	Deaths	Refs
11	March 4–7	55 (35)	998	Mozambique, Madagascar	None	None	
Pam	March 6–15	250 (155)	896	Fiji, Kiribati, Solomon Islands, Tuvalu, Vanuatu, New Caledonia, New Zealand	$360 million	16	
Haliba	March 7–10	85 (50)	993	Madagascar, Réunion, Mauritius	$6.3 million	26	
Olwyn	March 8–14	145 (85)	955	Western Australia	$76.1 million	1	
Nathan	March 9–25	165 (105)	963	Queensland, Northern Territory, Western Australia	Major	None	
Cari	March 10–13	65 (40)	998	None	None	None	
Bavi (Betty)	March 10–21	85 (40)	985	Vietnam, China	$16.6 million	9	
Reuben	March 19–23	75 (45)	990	Fiji, Tonga	None	None	
13F	March 19–21	Unspecified	1004	French Polynesia	None	None	
Maysak (Chedeng)	March 26 – April 7	195 (120)	910	Micronesia, Philippines	$8.5 million	5	
14F	March 28–31	55 (35)	998	Southern Cook Islands	None	None	

=== April ===
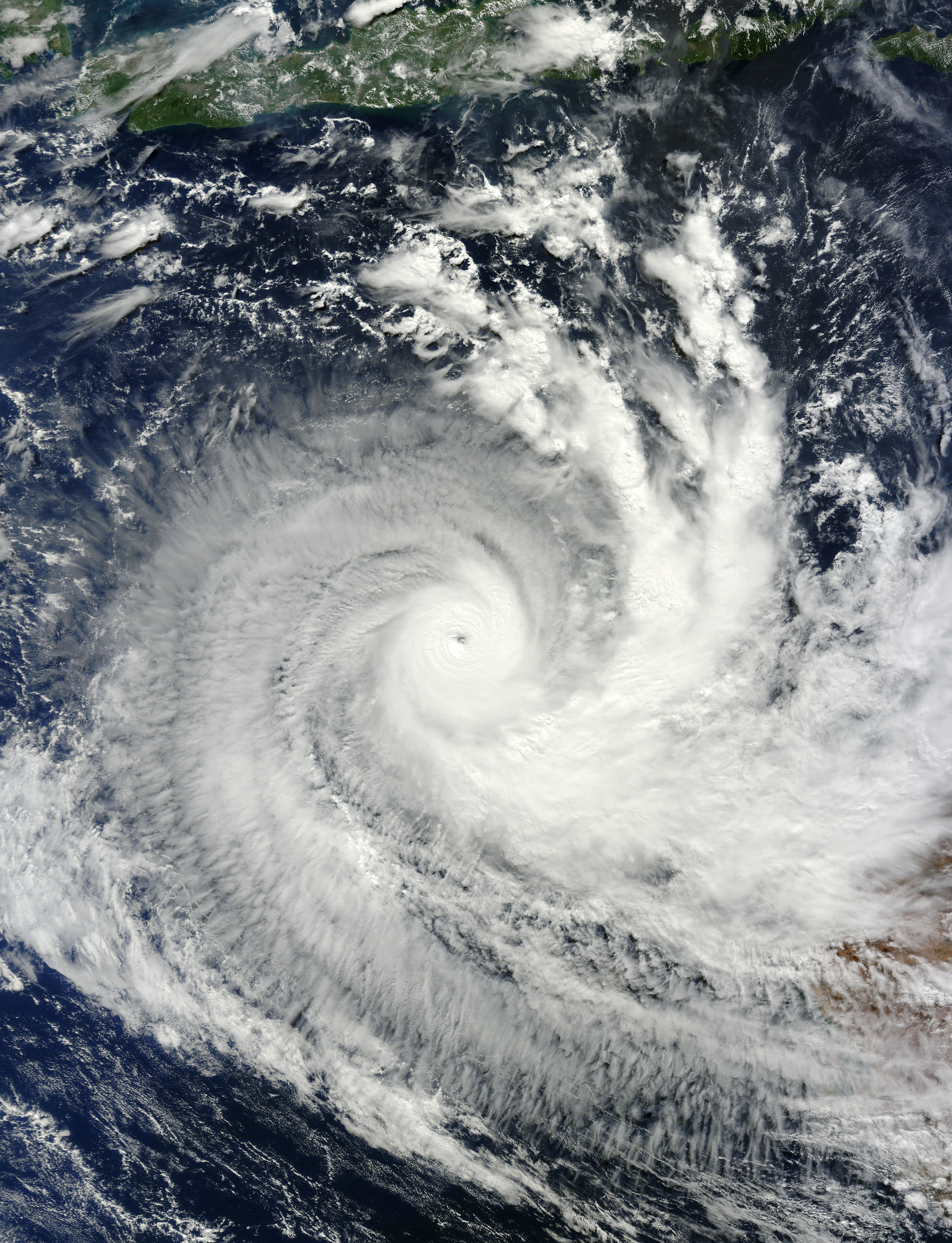
Cyclone Quang

Tropical cyclones formed in April 2015
Storm name	Dates active	Max wind km/h (mph)	Min pressure (mbar)	Areas affected	Damage (USD)	Deaths	Refs
Joalane	April 2–11	140 (85)	962	None	None	None	
Haishen	April 2–6	65 (40)	998	Caroline Islands	$200 thousand	None	
Ikola	April 5–8	175 (110)	953	None	None	None	
Solo	April 9–12	100 (65)	985	Solomon Islands, New Caledonia	Significant	None	
16F	April 15–16	Unspecified	1008	None	None	None	
Quang	April 27 – May 1	185 (115)	950	Western Australia	Minimal	None	
Katie	April 29 – May 6	75 (45)	993	Easter Island, Chile	None	None	

=== May ===
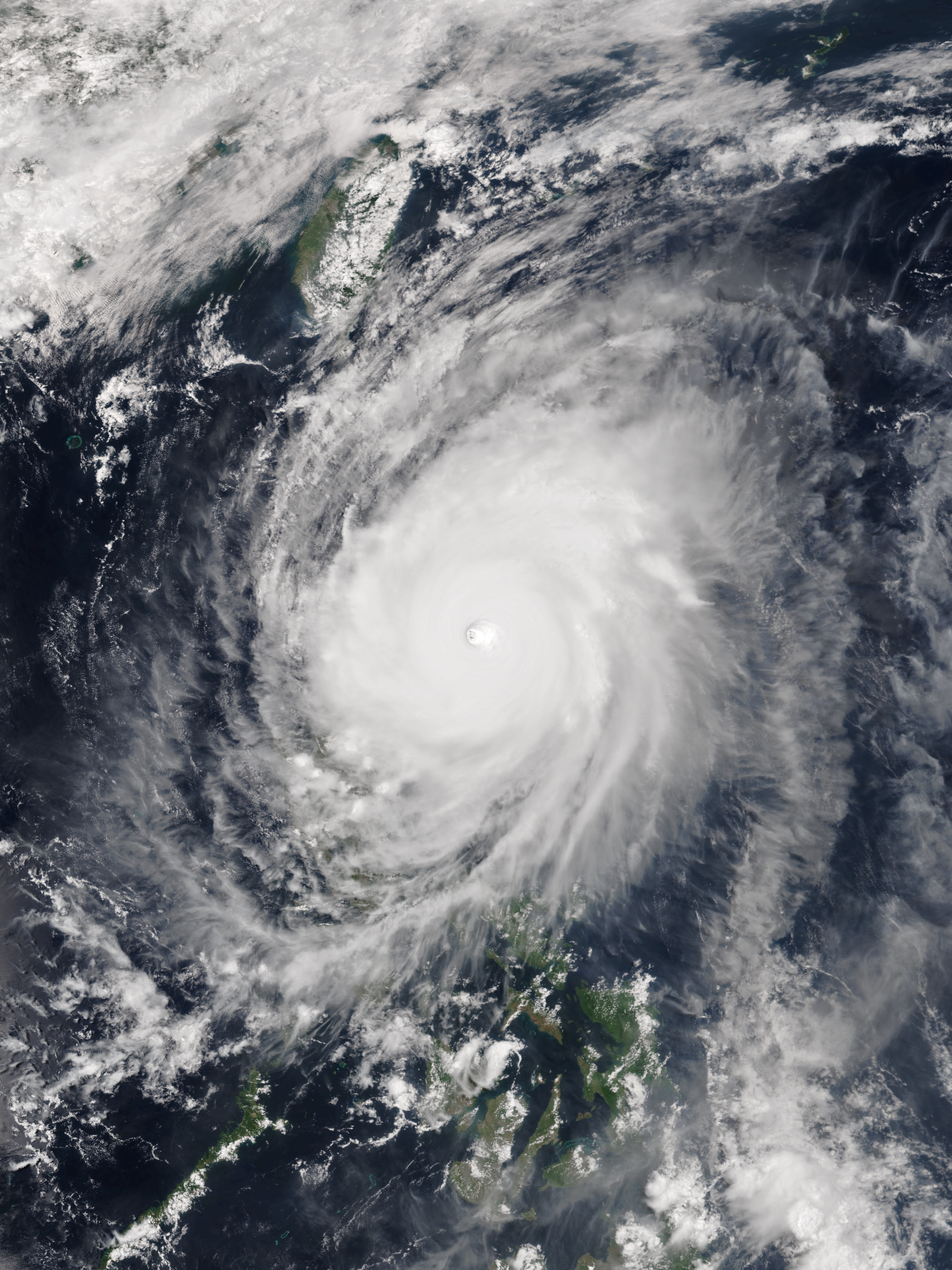
Typhoon Noul

May was a below average month, with five storms forming, all receiving a name. The month kicked off in the Western Pacific with Typhoons Noul, and Dolphin, Noul grazed the Philippines and Taiwan as a typhoon, while Dolphin did not impact any significant land mass. In the Atlantic, Ana formed, and caused minimal damage to the Southeastern United States. In the Eastern Pacific, Andres and Blanca formed, with Blanca impacting Mexico as a Tropical Storm.

Tropical cyclones formed in May 2015
Storm name	Dates active	Max wind km/h (mph)	Min pressure (mbar)	Areas affected	Damage (USD)	Deaths	Refs
Noul (Dodong)	May 2–12	205 (125)	920	Caroline Islands, Taiwan, Philippines, Japan	$23.5 million	2	
Dolphin	May 6–20	185 (115)	925	Caroline Islands, Mariana Islands	$10 million	None	
Ana	May 8–11	95 (60)^{4}	998	Southeastern United States	Minimal	2	
Andres	May 28 – June 4	230 (145)^{4}	937	Southwestern United States	None	None	
Blanca	May 31 – June 9	230 (145)^{4}	936	Western Mexico, Baja California Peninsula, Southwestern United States	$133 thousand	4	

=== June ===
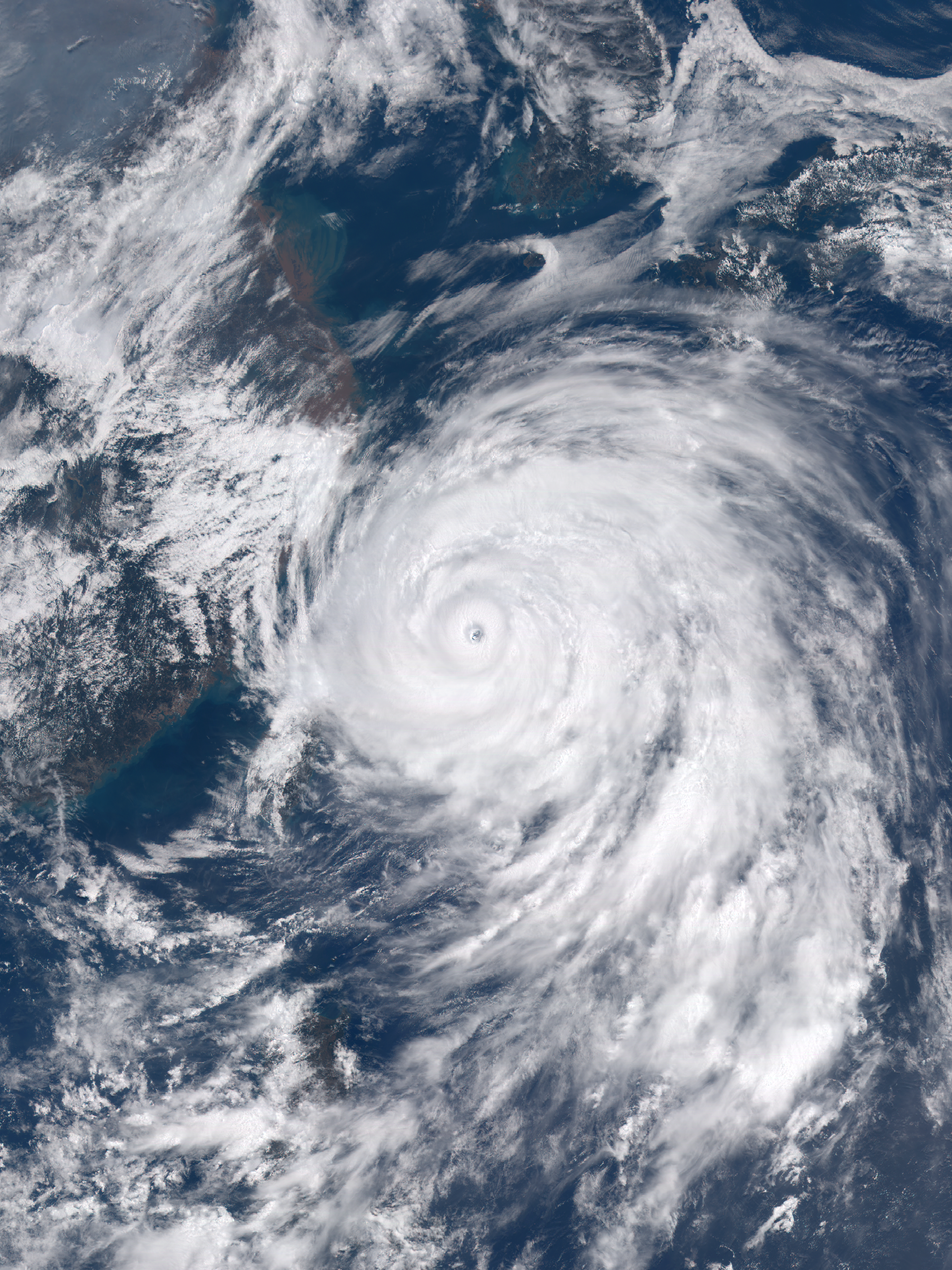
Typhoon Chan-hom

Tropical cyclones formed in June 2015
Storm name	Dates active	Max wind km/h (mph)	Min pressure (mbar)	Areas affected	Damage (USD)	Deaths	Refs
Ashobaa	June 7–12	85 (50)	990	Oman, United Arab Emirates	Minimal	None	
Carlos	June 10–17	150 (90)	978	Southwestern Mexico, Western Mexico	$1.04 million	None	
Bill	June 16–18	95 (60)	997	Central America, Yucatán Peninsula, Southern United States (Texas), Midwestern United States	$100 million	8 (1)	
Kujira	June 19–25	85 (50)	985	Vietnam, China	$16 million	9	
BOB 01	June 20–21	45 (30)	994	East India	Minimal	15	
ARB 02	June 22–24	55 (35)	988	West India	$260 million	81	
Raquel	June 28 – July 5	65 (40)	996	Solomon Islands	Minimal	1	
Chan-hom (Falcon)	June 29 – July 13	165 (105)	935	Mariana Islands, China, Taiwan, Korea, Russia	$1.58 billion	18	

=== July ===
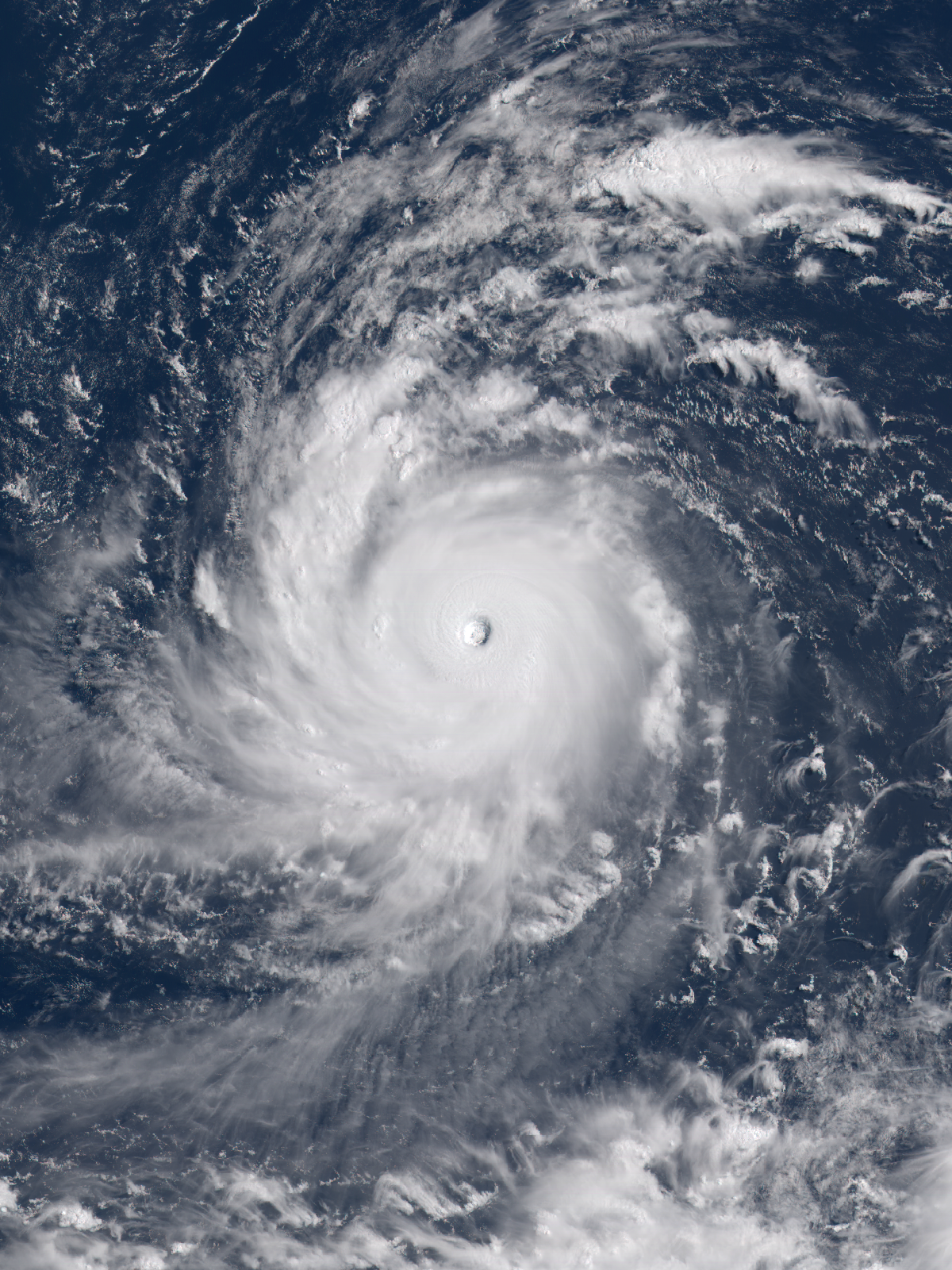
Typhoon Soudelor

Tropical cyclones formed in July 2015
Storm name	Dates active	Max wind km/h (mph)	Min pressure (mbar)	Areas affected	Damage (USD)	Deaths	Refs
TD	July 1–2	Not specified	1000	Caroline Islands	None	None	
Linfa (Egay)	July 1–10	95 (60)	980	Philippines, Taiwan, China, Vietnam	$285 million	1	
Nangka	July 2–18	185 (115)	925	Marshall Islands, Caroline Islands, Mariana Islands, Japan	$200 million	2	
Ela	July 8–10	75 (45)	1002	None	None	None	
Halola (Goring)	July 10–26	150 (90)	955	Wake Island, Japan, Korea	$1.24 million	None	
Iune	July 10–13	65 (40)	1004	None	None	None	
LAND 01	July 10–12	45 (30)	994	North India, Nepal	None	None	
Dolores	July 11–19	215 (130)	946	Southwestern Mexico, Western Mexico, Baja California Peninsula, Southwestern United States	$50.477 million	1	
Enrique	July 12–18	85 (50)	1000	None	None	None	
Claudette	July 13–14	85 (60)	1003	East Coast of the United States, Newfoundland	None	None	
TD	July 14	Not specified	1000	None	None	None	
TD	July 15–16	Not specified	1000	None	None	None	
TD	July 18–20	Not specified	1004	Japan	None	None	
TD	July 20–21	Not specified	1000	China	None	None	
12W	July 22–25	65 (40)	1008	Philippines	None	None	
Felicia	July 23–25	65 (40)	1004	None	None	None	
Komen	July 26 – August 2	75 (45)	986	Bangladesh, Myanmar, Northeastern India	$617 million	187	
Eight-E	July 27–29	55 (35)	1006	None	None	None	
LAND 02	July 27–30	55 (35)	994	Central India	None	None	
Guillermo	July 29 – August 7	175 (110)	967	Hawaii, Northern California	None	None	
Soudelor (Hanna)	July 29 – August 11	215 (130)	900	Mariana Islands, Philippines, Taiwan, Ryukyu Islands, China, Korea, Japan	$4.09 billion	59	
01F	July 29 – August 4	Not specified	1000	Solomon Islands, Vanuatu	None	None	

=== August ===
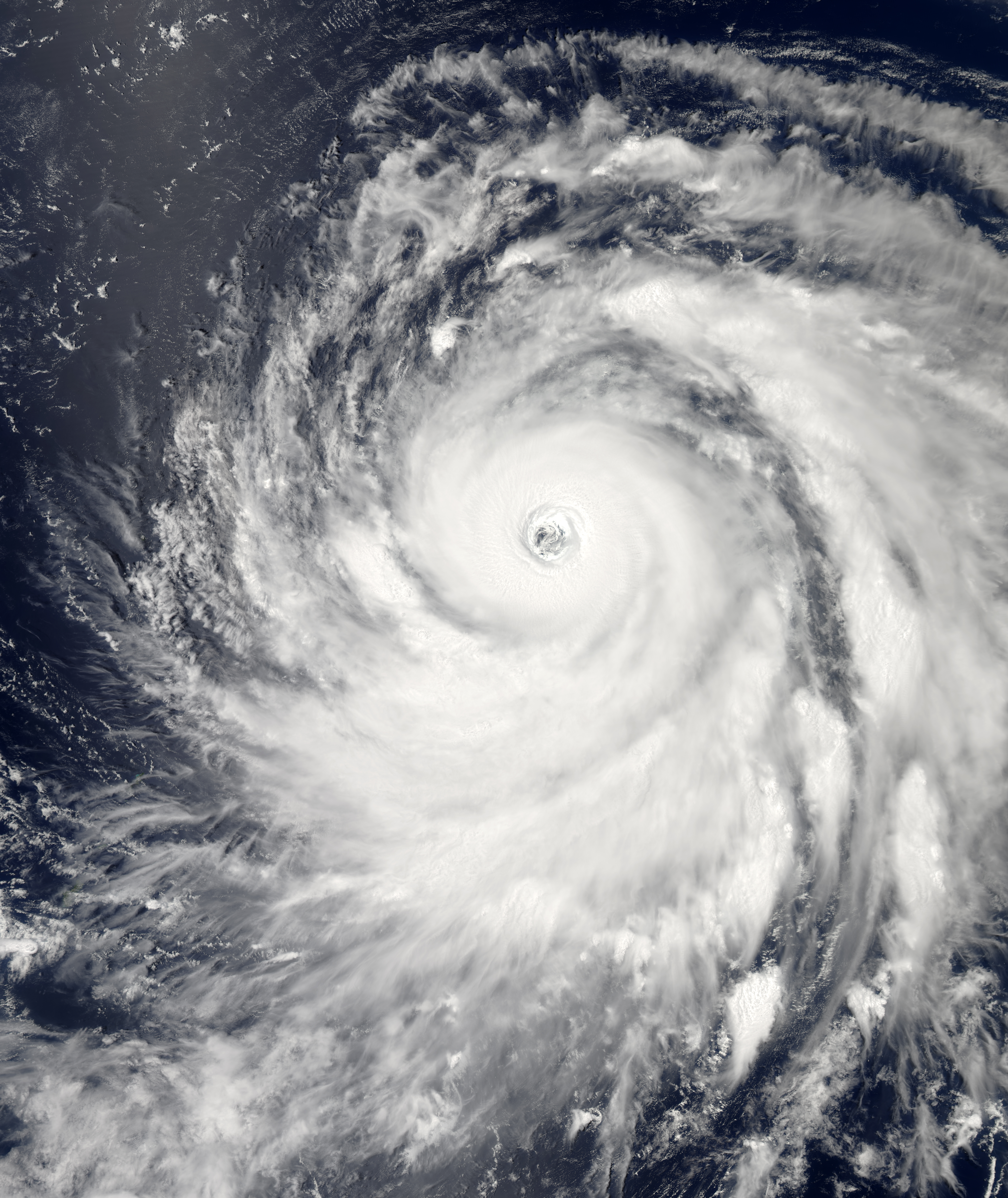
Typhoon Atsani

August was slightly below average with fifteen storms forming, twelve being named. The month started off in the Western Pacific with the formation of Tropical Depression 12W, which struck Japan. Molave, Goni, and Atsani formed as well, with the latter being the strongest storm of the month. In the Eastern Pacific, four storms formed; Hilda, Ignacio, Jimena, and Kevin. None of which severely impacted land. However, Jimena became the 2nd strongest storm in the Eastern Pacific ocean in 2015. Moving over to the Central Pacific, Hurricane Loke and Hurricane Kilo formed, both of which did not impact land. In the Atlantic Ocean, Danny, Erika, and Fred formed, with Erika being one of the most deadly and destructive disasters in the history of Dominica, and the worst disaster in the country since Hurricane David in 1979. No storms were named in the north Indian Ocean.

Tropical cyclones formed in August 2015
Storm name	Dates active	Max wind km/h (mph)	Min pressure (mbar)	Areas affected	Damage (USD)	Deaths	Refs
12W	August 1–5	55 (35)	1008	Japan	None	None	
LAND 03	August 4	45 (30)	998	Central India	None	None	
Molave	August 6–14	85 (50)	985	None	None	None	
Hilda	August 6–14	230 (145)	937	Hawaii	None	None	
Goni (Ineng)	August 13–25	185 (115)	930	Mariana Islands, Philippines, Taiwan Japan, Korea, China, Russia	$1.05 billion	74	
Atsani	August 14–25	185 (115)	925	Mariana Islands	Nonr	None	
Eleven-E	August 16–17	55 (35)	1003	None	None	None	
Danny	August 18–24	205 (125)	960	Lesser Antilles, Puerto Rico	Minimal	None	
Loke	August 21–26	120 (75)	985	Hawaii	None	None	
Kilo	August 22 – September 1	220 (140)	940	Hawaii, Johnston Atoll	None	None	
Ignacio	August 25 – September 5	230 (145)	942	Hawaii	None	None	
Erika	August 25–29	85 (50)	1001	Lesser Antilles, Greater Antilles, Florida	$511.4 million	31	
Jimena	August 26– September 9	250 (155)	932	None	None	None	
Fred	August 30 – September 6	140 (85)	986	West Africa, Cape Verde	$2.5 million	9	
Kevin	August 31 – September 5	95 (60)	998	Baja California Peninsula, Southwestern United States	None	None	

=== September ===
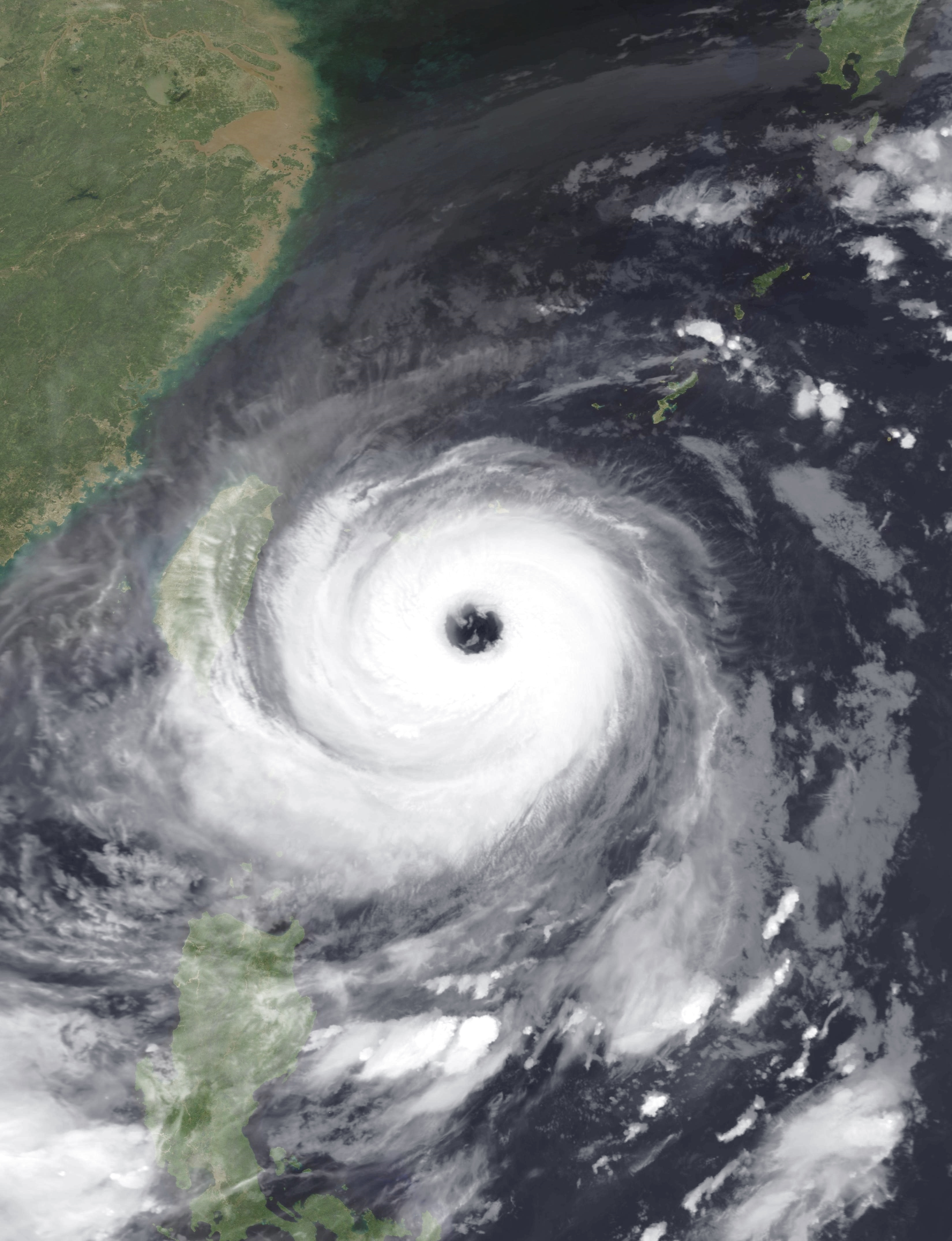
Typhoon Dujuan

Tropical cyclones formed in September 2015
Storm name	Dates active	Max wind km/h (mph)	Min pressure (mbar)	Areas affected	Damage (USD)	Deaths	Refs
Grace	September 5–9	95 (60)	1000	None	None	None	
Linda	September 5–14	205 (125)	950	Sinaloa, Zacatecas, Southwestern United States	$2.59 million	22	
Etau	September 6–11	95 (60)	985	Japan, Russia	$2.41 billion	8	
Henri	September 8–11	85 (50)	1003	None	None	None	
Vamco	September 13–15	65 (40)	998	Vietnam, Laos, Cambodia, Thailand, Indochina	$14.1 million	15	
Krovanh	September 13–21	155 (100)	945	None	None	None	
Land 04	September 16–19	55 (35)	994	Central India			
Nine	September 16–19	55 (35)	1006	None	None	None	
Ida	September 18–27	85 (50)	1001	None	None	None	
Malia	September 18–22	85 (50)	992	Hawaii	None	None	
Dujuan (Jenny)	September 19–30	205 (125)	925	Mariana Islands, Taiwan, China	$407 million	3	
Sixteen-E	September 20–21	55 (35)	1001	Baja California Peninsula, Mexico, Southwestern United States	$17.8 million	1	
Niala	September 25–28	100 (65)	992	Hawaii	None	None	
Marty	September 26–30	130 (80)	987	Mexico	$30 million	None	
Joaquin	September 28 – October 8	250 (155)	931	Turks and Caicos Islands, The Bahamas, Cuba, Haiti Southeastern United States, Bermuda, Azores, Iberian Peninsula	$200 million	34	
Mujigae (Kabayan)	September 30 – October 5	155 (100)	950	Philippines, China, Vietnam	$4.26 billion	29	

=== October ===
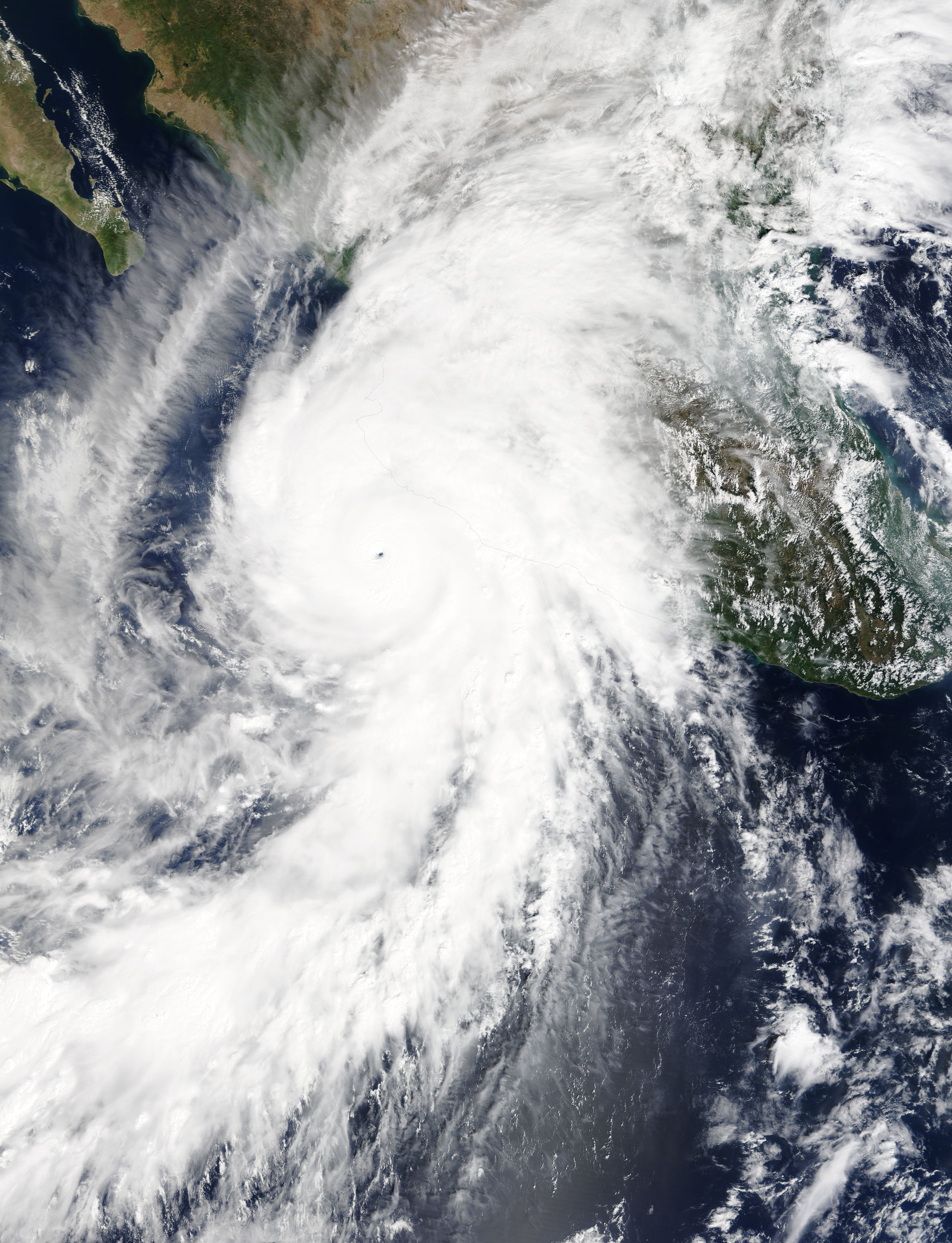
Hurricane Patricia

October was slightly active, with fourteen storms forming, eight receiving names. The month ramped off in the Western Pacific with Severe Tropical Storm Choi-wan, which impacted Japan and Russia. Following that was Koppu almost 2 weeks later, then Champi just a day later, which impacted the Marshall and Mariana islands. In the Eastern Pacific, Tropical Storm Nora, Hurricane Olaf, and Hurricane Patricia formed, with the latter becoming the 2nd most intense tropical cyclone worldwide, and the strongest storm this year. In the Central Pacific, Hurricane Oho formed, the last of 8 named storms in the basin this year. Oho impacted Canada and Alaska as an extratropical cyclone. In the North Indian Ocean, Cyclone Chapala was the strongest storm in the basin that year, reaching Category 4-equivalent strength.

Tropical cyclones formed in October 2015
Storm name	Dates active	Max wind km/h (mph)	Min pressure (mbar)	Areas affected	Damage (USD)	Deaths	Refs
Choi-wan	October 1–7	110 (70)	965	Wake Island, Japan, Russia	None	None	
Oho	October 3–8	175 (110)	957	Western Canada, Alaska	None	None	
Eight-C	October 3–4	55 (35)	1001	None	None	None	
08C	October 6–7	Not specified	1002	None	None	None	
ARB 03	October 9–12	55 (35)	1000	None	None	None	
Nora	October 9–15	110 (70)	993	None	None	None	
02F	October 12–18	45 (30)	1001	Vanuatu	None	None	
Koppu (Lando)	October 12–21	185 (115)	925	Mariana Islands, Philippines, Taiwan, Japan	$313 million	62	
Champi	October 13–25	175 (110)	930	Marshall Islands, Mariana Islands	None	None	
Olaf	October 15–27	240 (150)	938	None	None	None	
TD	October 19–21	Not specified	Not specified	None	None	None	
26W	October 19–22	55 (35)	1004	None	None	None	
Patricia	October 20–24	345 (215)	872	Central America, Mexico, Texas	$462.8 million	8	
Chapala	October 28 – November 4	215 (130)	940	Oman, Yemen, Somaliland Somalia	>$100 million	9	

=== November ===
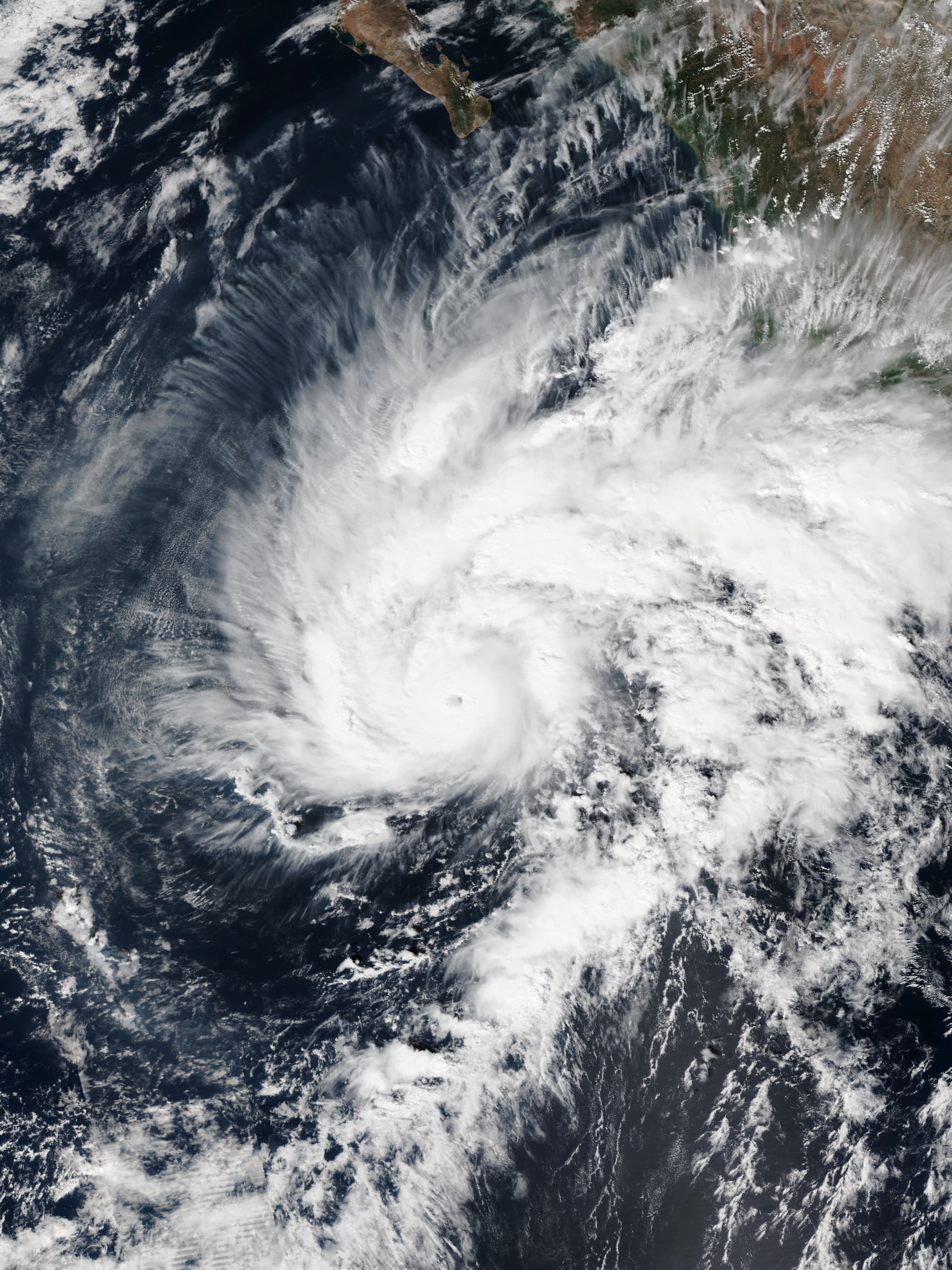
Hurricane Sandra

Tropical cyclones formed in November 2015
Storm name	Dates active	Max wind km/h (mph)	Min pressure (mbar)	Areas affected	Damage (USD)	Deaths	Refs
Megh	November 5–10	175 (110)	964	Oman, Somaliland Somalia, Yemen	Unknown	18	
BOB 03	November 8–10	55 (35)	991	South India, Sri Lanka	Unknown	71	
Kate	November 6–11	140 (85)	980	The Bahamas, United Kingdom, Ireland	Minimal	None	
In-fa (Marilyn)	November 16–27	175 (110)	935	Micronesia, Guam	None	None	
Rick	November 18–22	65 (40)	1002	Nonr	None	None	
Annabelle	November 19–24	100 (65)	983	None	None	None	
Sandra	November 23–28	240 (150)	935	Central America, Baja California, Mexico	Minimal	4	
Tuni	November 26–30	75 (45)	992	Tuvalu, Samoan Islands, Niue, Tonga	$5 million	None	

=== December ===
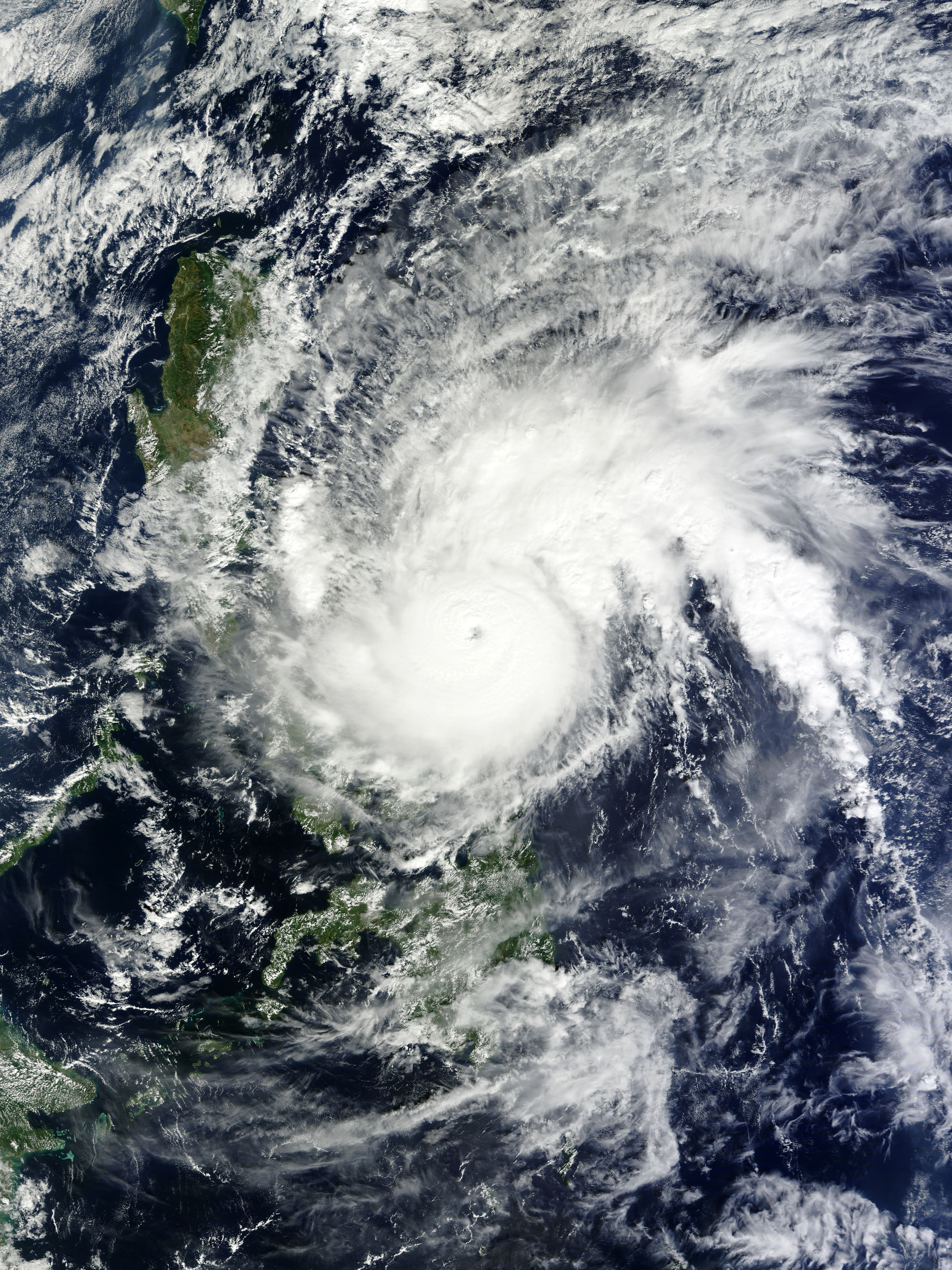
Typhoon Melor

December was active, with 12 storms forming, however, only 3 of these storms were named, a number unusually below average. The month started with Tropical Disturbance 04F on December 1st, which impacted French Polynesia briefly before dissipating the following day. Tropical Disturbance 06F impacted Wallis and Futuna, and Tropical Depression 07F impacted the Solomon Islands, Fiji, and Tuvalu. In the South-West Indian Ocean, Cyclone Bohale stayed out to sea, not causing any threats. In the Australian Region, no cyclones were named. A few tropical lows existed, and never severely threatened land. Tropical Low 05U made landfall on Northern Territory, and extended into Queensland. In the Western Pacific, Typhoon Melor (named Typhoon Nona in the Philippines) is the strongest storm this month. Tropical Depression 29W caused minor damage to the Caroline Islands as well as the Philippines after Typhoon Melor. An unnamed tropical depression also formed and made landfall on Borneo and Malaysia. In the Eastern Pacific, Tropical Depression Nine-C became the latest forming and dissipating Tropical Cyclone in the Eastern Pacific on record, forming on December 31st, and dissipating a few hours later.

Tropical cyclones formed in December 2015
Storm name	Dates active	Max wind km/h (mph)	Min pressure (mbar)	Areas affected	Damage (USD)	Deaths	Refs
04F	December 1–2	Not specified	1003	French Polynesia	None	None	
Bohale	December 9–12	65 (40)	995	None	None	None	
Melor (Nona)	December 10–17	175 (110)	935	Caroline Islands, Philippines	$148 million	51	
29W (Onyok)	December 14–19	55 (35)	1002	Caroline Islands, Philippines	$23.3 thousand	None	
04U	December 17–23	Not specified	1006	None	None	None	
TD	December 20–23	Not specified	1008	Borneo, Malaysia	None	None	
05U	December 21 – January 2	55 (35)	994	Northern Territory, Queensland	None	None	
06F	December 27–30	Not specified	997	Wallis and Futuna	None	None	
06U	December 27–29	Not specified	Not specified	None	None	None	
07F	December 28 – January 1	Not specified	995	Solomon Islands, Tuvalu, Fiji	None	3	
Ula	December 29 – January 12	185 (115)	944	Tuvalu, Samoan Islands, Tonga, Fiji, Vanuatu, New Caledonia	None	1	
Nine-C	December 31	55 (35)	1001	None	None	None	

== Global effects ==
Season name		Areas affected	Systems formed	Named storms	Hurricanes Typhoons Cyclones	Damage (USD)	Deaths	Ref
North Atlantic Ocean (Note: The wind speeds for this tropical cyclone/basin are based on the Saffir Simpson Scale which uses 1-minute sustained winds.)		Yucatán Peninsula, Cayman Islands, Cuba, United States, Canada, Lesser Antilles, Hispaniola, Puerto Rico, The Bahamas, Bermuda, Iceland, Ireland, United Kingdom, Hispaniola, West Africa, Cape Verde, Azores	12	11	4	$813.7 million	89	
Eastern and Central Pacific Ocean		Mexico, Baja California Sur, Southwestern United States, Hawaii, Johnston Atoll, Central America, Colima, Sonora, Nayarit	31	26	18	$588 million	45	
Western Pacific Ocean (Note: Only systems that formed either before or on December 31, 2015 are counted in the seasonal totals.)		Micronesia, Taiwan, Philippines, China, Vietnam, Mariana Islands, Japan, Korean Peninsula, Laos, Russian Far East, Thailand, Myanmar, Alaska	36 (Note: According to the JTWC, two systems—Halola and Kilo—entered into the Western Pacific from Central Pacific.)	25	19	$15.56 billion	349	
North Indian Ocean (Note: The wind speeds for this tropical cyclone/basin are based on the IMD Scale which uses 3-minute sustained winds.)		India, Bangladesh, Myanmar, Maldives, Sri Lanka, Yemen, Oman, Saudi Arabia, Somalia, Djibouti, Eritrea	12	4	2	>$2.42 billion	453	
South-West Indian Ocean	January – June (Note: Only systems that formed either on or after January 1, 2015 are counted in the seasonal totals.) (Note: The wind speeds for this tropical cyclone are based on Météo-France, which uses wind gusts.)	Madagascar, Mozambique, Mauritius, Réunion	10	9	4	$46.3 million	111	
South-West Indian Ocean	July – December	—N/a	2	2	0	Unknown	Unknown	
Australian region	January – June	Indonesia, Australia, Solomon Islands, Papua New Guinea	13	6	5	$798.4 million	2	
Australian region	July – December	Northern Territory, Queensland	3	—N/a	0	Unknown	Unknown	
South Pacific Ocean	January – June	Fiji, New Caledonia, Vanuatu, Tonga, New Zealand, Samoan Islands, Wallis and Futuna, Niue, Solomon Islands	10, 1 unofficial	5	2	$543 million	17	
South Pacific Ocean	July – December	Solomon Islands, Vanuatu, Tuvalu, Samoan Islands, Niue, Tonga, French Polynesia, Fiji, Wallis and Futuna	7	2	1	$5 million	1	
South Atlantic Ocean		Brazil	3	2	0	Unknown	2	
Worldwide		(See above)	140 (Note: The sum of the number of systems in each basin will not equal the number shown as the total. This is because when systems move between basins, it creates a discrepancy in the actual number of systems.)	93	55	$20.78 billion	1,069	

== Notes ==
^{1} Only systems that formed either on or after January 1, 2015 are counted in the seasonal totals.
^{2} Only systems that formed either before or on December 31, 2015 are counted in the seasonal totals.
^{3} The wind speeds for this tropical cyclone/basin are based on the IMD Scale which uses 3-minute sustained winds.
^{4} The wind speeds for this tropical cyclone/basin are based on the Saffir Simpson Scale which uses 1-minute sustained winds.
^{5}The wind speeds for this tropical cyclone are based on Météo-France which uses gust winds.

== See also ==
- Tropical cyclones by year
- List of earthquakes in 2015
- Tornadoes of 2015
