= Tropical Storm Chedza =

Severe Tropical Storm Chedza
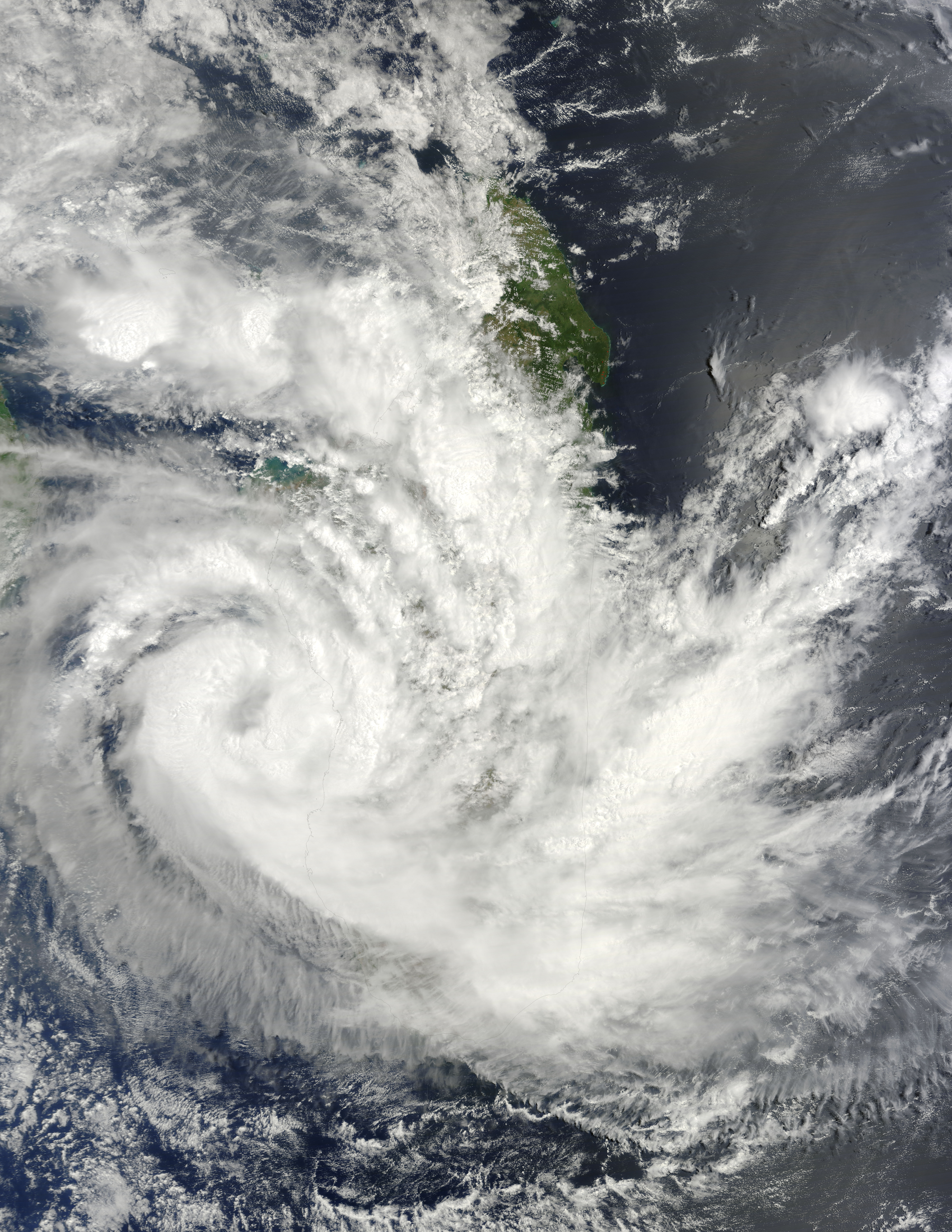
- Satellite image of Chedza approaching Madagascar on January 16

Meteorological history
- Formed: January 14, 2015
- Subtropical: January 17, 2015
- Post-tropical: January 19, 2015
- Dissipated: January 22, 2015

Severe tropical storm
- 10-minute sustained (MFR)
- Highest winds: 105 km/h (65 mph)
- Highest gusts: 150 km/h (90 mph)
- Lowest pressure: 975 hPa (mbar); 28.79 inHg

Tropical storm
- 1-minute sustained (SSHWS/JTWC)
- Highest winds: 95 km/h (60 mph)
- Lowest pressure: 985 hPa (mbar); 29.09 inHg

Overall effects
- Fatalities: 80 total (Note: Excludes another 176 deaths in Malawi and 120 deaths in Mozambique from its precursor disturbance.)
- Damage: $40 million (2015 USD)
- Areas affected: Zimbabwe, Malawi, Mozambique, Madagascar, Réunion
- IBTrACS /
- Part of the 2014–15 South-West Indian Ocean cyclone season

Severe Tropical Storm Chedza was a deadly tropical cyclone that struck Madagascar in January 2015. It formed from the Intertropical Convergence Zone and moved over Mozambique, After moving open waters, the system began organizing on January 14, becoming Tropical Storm Chedza two days later. It quickly intensified over the Mozambique Channel due to warm waters and favorable conditions, and the storm attained peak 10 minute sustained winds of 100 km/h (60 mph) on January 16. That day, Chedza moved ashore western Madagascar between Belo sur Mer and Morondava, and it quickly crossed the island while weakening. The storm briefly re-intensified, passing southwest of Réunion before turning to the southeast. Chedza became extratropical on January 19, and was last noted two days later.

The formative stages of Chedza brought rainfall to an already flooded region across southeastern Africa. Weeks of heavy rainfall killed 117 people in Mozambique and 104 in neighboring Malawi, where it was the worst floods in 24 years. In Madagascar, Chedza struck after weeks of heavy rainfall, causing rivers to increase and flooding widespread areas of crop fields. In the capital city of Antananarivo, the deluge damaged the main water pump that controlled water levels in the region. The rainfall caused mudslides and damaged roads. Across the country, flooding from Chedza displaced 54,792 people, after destroying 4,430 houses and flooding another 3,442, mostly in Vatovavy-Fitovinany in the southeastern portion. Chedza killed 80 people and caused about $40 million in damage (2015 USD). Later, the storm brought heavy rainfall and strong winds to the mountainous peaks of Réunion.

== Meteorological history ==
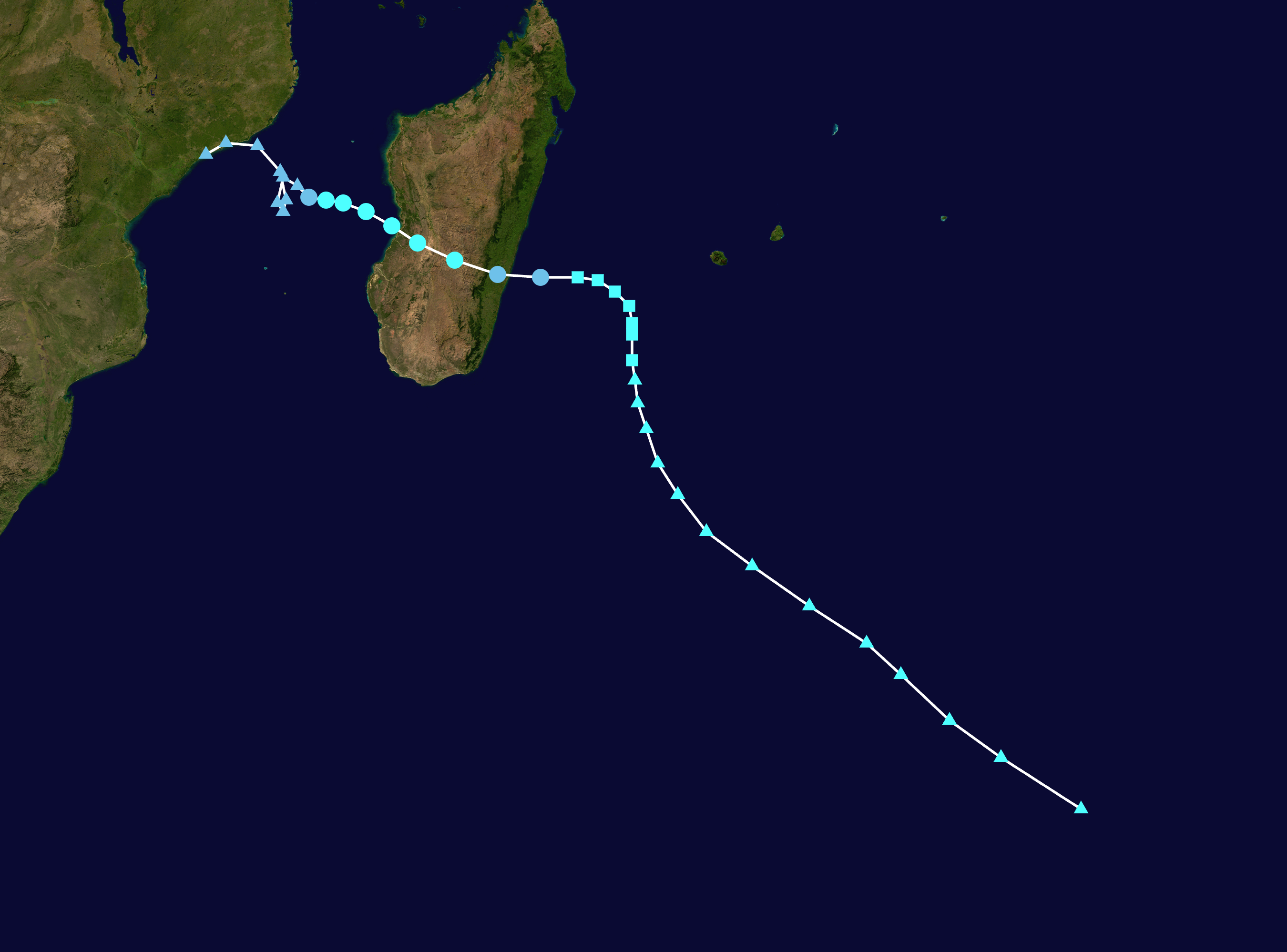
Map plotting the storm's track and intensity, according to the Saffir–Simpson scale Map key Saffir–Simpson scale Tropical depression (≤38 mph, ≤62 km/h) Tropical storm (39–73 mph, 63–118 km/h) Category 1 (74–95 mph, 119–153 km/h) Category 2 (96–110 mph, 154–177 km/h) Category 3 (111–129 mph, 178–208 km/h) Category 4 (130–156 mph, 209–251 km/h) Category 5 (≥157 mph, ≥252 km/h) Unknown Storm type Tropical cyclone Subtropical cyclone Extratropical cyclone, remnant low, tropical disturbance, or monsoon depression

An area of convection, or thunderstorms, developed on January 9 within the Intertropical Convergence Zone between the coast of Mozambique and the Mozambique Channel, while moving generally southward. It originated from the same monsoon trough that spawned the powerful Cyclone Bansi. A broad circulation formed within the system on January 12 along the coast of Mozambique, aided by good outflow to the south. Warm sea surface temperatures favored development, although it was located within an area of moderate to high wind shear. On January 14, the Météo-France (MFR) office on Réunion (Note: The Météo-France office in Réunion is the official Regional Specialized Meteorological Center for the basin.) began monitoring the system, labeling it Zone of Disturbed Weather 6 about 170 km (105 mi) east-southeast of Pebane, Mozambique.

A ridge to the north steered the system to the east-southeast. Convection continued to pulse around the system, some of the thunderstorms far from the center, and there were several circulations. The system quickly organized into Tropical Disturbance 6 by 12:00 UTC on January 14 as conditions became more favorable. The thunderstorms continued to fluctuate, exposing the circulation briefly, before the system became much better organized on January 15. Later that day, the disturbance intensified into Tropical Depression 6, and at 00:00 UTC on January 16, the MFR upgraded the system to Tropical Storm Chedza. At the same time, the Joint Typhoon Warning Center (JTWC) (Note: The Joint Typhoon Warning Center is a joint United States Navy – United States Air Force task force that issues tropical cyclone warnings for the western Pacific Ocean and other regions.) began tracking the system as Tropical Cyclone 05S. Despite having intensified into a tropical storm, Chedza initially resembled a monsoon depression. However, strengthening was expected due to low wind shear and the warm waters. The storm quickly intensified while approaching western Madagascar, and the MFR upgraded it to a severe tropical storm with peak 10 minute sustained winds of 100 km/h (60 mph). The convection wrapped into the circulation more as the circulation consolidated and became more defined, prompting the JTWC to estimate peak 1 minute winds of 95 km/h (60 mph). Before 18:00 UTC on January 16, Chedza moved ashore in western Madagascar between Belo sur Mer and Morondava, and it quickly weakened to tropical depression status over land.

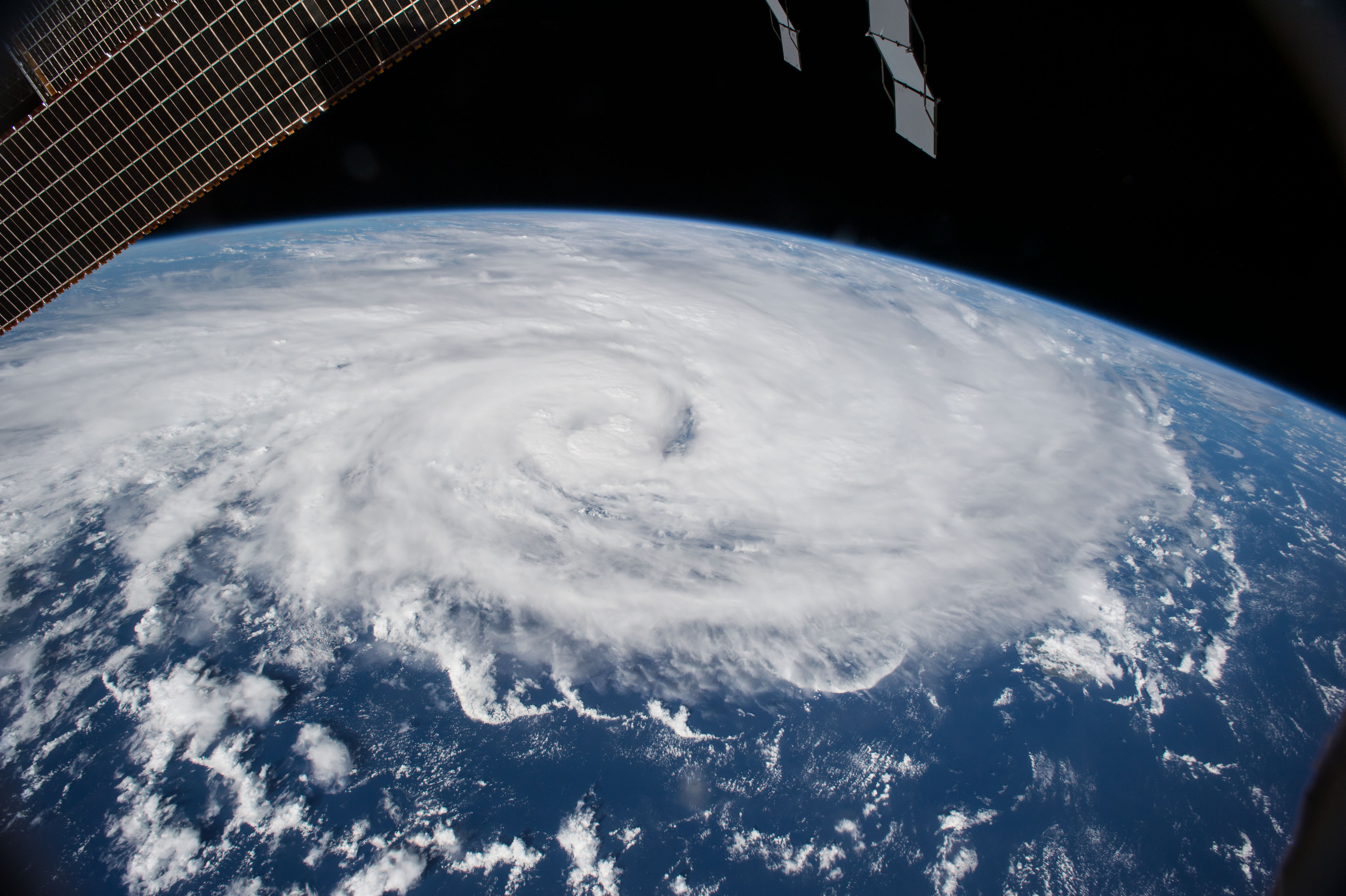
View of Severe Tropical Storm Chedza from the International Space Station

At around 10:00 UTC on February 17, Chedza emerged over open waters. By that time, the circulation was slightly exposed with the bulk of the convection along the southern periphery. Later on January 17, Chedza organized and re-intensified into a tropical storm. By contrast, the JTWC ceased issuing advisories on January 18, noting that the storm was dissipating due to increased wind shear. Chedza turned to the southeast toward a trough and continued strengthening. Although the MFR described the structure as "unconventional", the agency estimated a secondary peak of 95 km/h (60 mph). On January 19, the convection became far removed from the center as wind shear increased, and Chedza transitioned into a post-tropical cyclone as it began becoming extratropical. The MFR issued their last advisory on the storm on January 20, and they last noted the storm on the following day moving southward.

== Impact ==
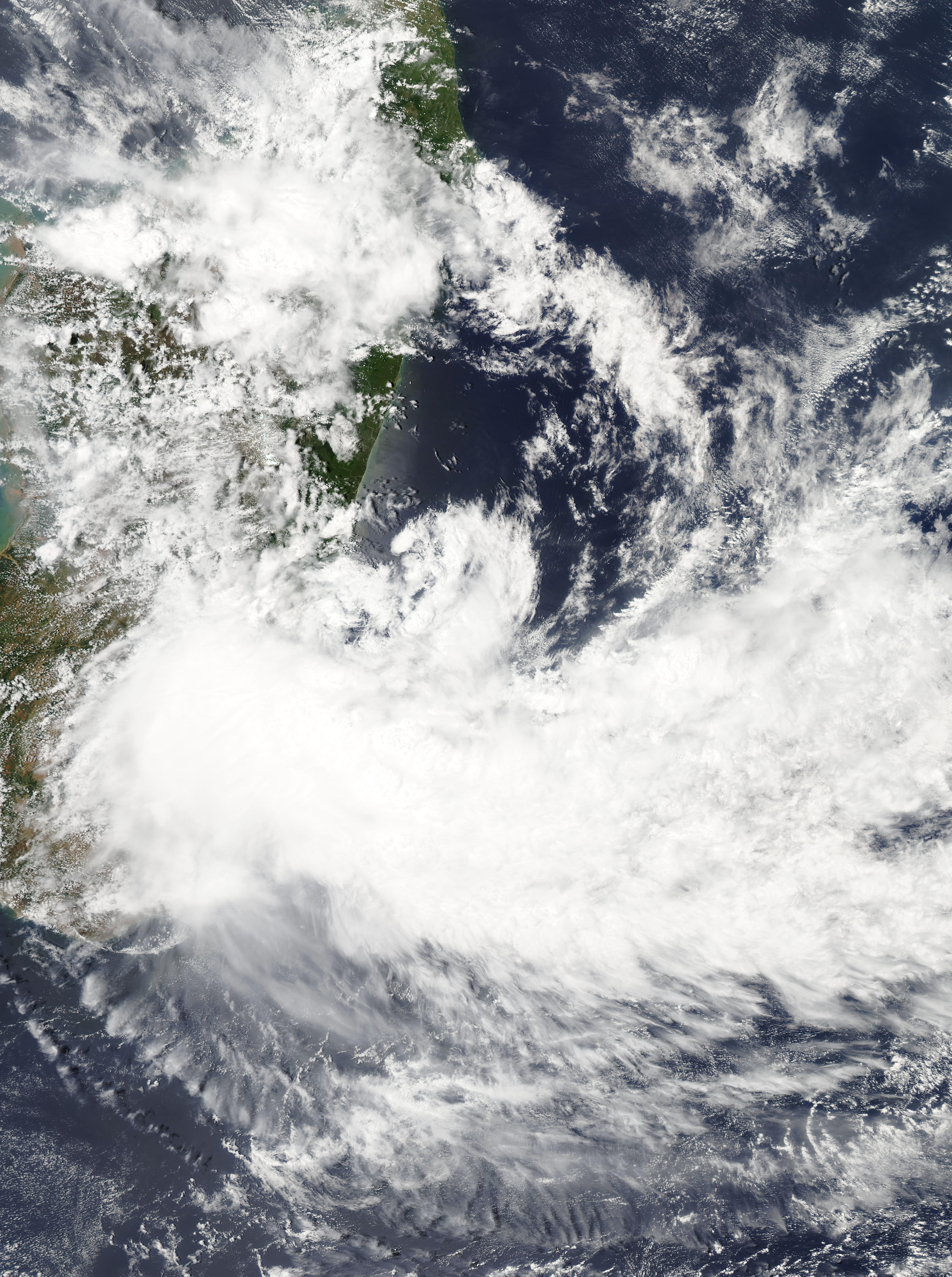
Satellite image of Chedza leaving Madagascar on January 17

In its formative stages, Chedza moved over Mozambique on January 14, producing flooding in the country as well as neighboring Malawi and Zimbabwe.

In Malawi, the formative stages of Chedza brought heavy rainfall that caused deadly floods, following two weeks of precipitation. Widespread flooding covered homes and farmlands in the country's southern portion.

At least 260,000 people were left homeless, and there were 176 fatalities. The Malawian government requested $430 million in international aid to cope with flood recovery. It was the worst flooding in Malawi in 24 years, when floods in 1991 caused $24 million in damage (1991 USD).

When the precursor to Chedza moved over Mozambique, heavy rainfall caused deadly floods that killed 120 people.

In western Madagascar, Morondava reported 10 minute winds of 99 km/h (62 mph) while Chedza was making landfall. Ahead of the storm, the MFR anticipated a storm surge of 1 to 2 m (3.3 to 6.6 ft) along the coast. The storm struck after Madagascar was experiencing several weeks of heavy rainfall, with river levels already increased. By early February, much of the country had received twice its average rainfall for the time period. After the storm moved through the region, the Ikopa River reached 4.65 m (15.3 ft) at Bevomanga, above the alert stage of 4.5 m (15 ft). The river fell below alert stage by January 21. The Sisaony River at Ampitatafika reached 1.04 m (3.4 ft). High rains damaged the water pump station in Antananarivo, which controlled water levels in the city; this caused increased flooding and damage along nearby rivers. Across the country, flooding from Chedza displaced another 54,792 people, after destroying 4,430 houses and flooding another 3,442, mostly in Vatovavy-Fitovinany. Chedza damaged or flooded 969 classrooms, disrupting the education of 48,000 students. The storm also damaged 44 health centers and eight district hospitals, with 80 administrative buildings impacted. The floods inundated 9,922 ha (24,520 acres) of fields, including 8,494 ha (20,990 acres) of damaged rice fields, left 1,226 heads of cattle missing. The storm also damaged 42 roads and six bridges, and one dam was damaged. Throughout the country, Chedza killed 80 people, many of whom killed by landslides, and damage was estimated at over 100 billion ariary (US$40 million).

Late in its duration, Chedza spread a plume of moisture across Réunion over three days. Salazie in the mountainous center portion of the island recorded 270 mm (11 in), including 118 mm (4.6 in) in just 12 hours. During the storm's passage to the southwest, Chedza produced peak wind gusts of 90 km/h (56 mph) at Gîte de Bellecombe. The storm also caused high waves along Réunion's west coast, with peak wave of 6.8 m (22 ft).

== Aftermath ==
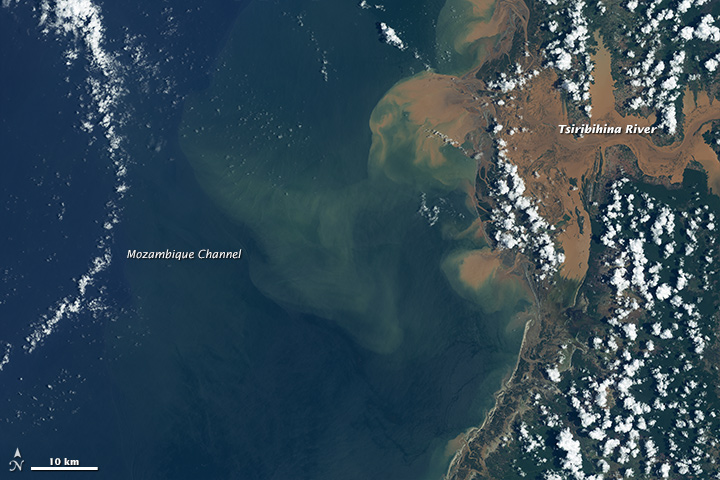
Rivers were swollen and brown with sediment in Tsiribihina River

Malawi president Peter Mutharika declared 15 of the country's 28 districts as disaster areas, mainly in the southern portion. The government requested $430 million worth of international aid to assist in relief efforts. By a month after the worst of the floods in Malawi, the World Food Programme provided meals to 288,000 people.

Immediately following the storm, Madagascar's National Social Insurance Fund provided blankets, soap, candles, and rice to storm victims. Other agencies distributed supplies such as pots, food, tents, and candles. The government set up temporary shelters that housed at least 20,000 people. The floods displaced "untold numbers of rats", according to the World Health Organization, which potentially contributed to the ongoing plague outbreak. The floods began subsiding by the end of January, allowing the displaced residents to return home. In response to the deaths, the Malagasy government ordered flags to be flown at half-mast. On January 28, the government launched a request for international assistance due to the heavy damage. In response, the government of Japan provided ¥17 million (US$142,000) worth of supplies, such as tents and water purifiers.

== See also ==
- Weather of 2015
- Tropical cyclones in 2015
- Tropical Storm Delfina – Weak storm in 2003 that killed 56 people in Mozambique while moving over land
- Cyclone Haruna – Stronger cyclone in 2013 that took a similar track, killing 26 in Madagascar
- Tropical Storm Alvaro – Similar-tracking storm in 2023 with a similar intensity.
