= 2015 Southeast Africa floods =

Natural disaster in Africa

2015 Southeast Africa Floods
- Date: January 9–20, 2015
- Location: Malawi Mozambique Madagascar Zimbabwe
- Deaths: At least 225 killed At least 153 missing 400,000+ displaced
- Property damage: At least USD $300,000,000

The 2015 Southeast Africa floods, partially related to Cyclone Bansi and Tropical Storm Chedza, killed at least 176 people in Malawi, 86 in Mozambique, and at least 46 in Madagascar over the course of a week while leaving hundreds more missing. Vice President of Malawi Saulos Chilima stated that over 200,000 Malawian people have been displaced by the flood. About 400,000 African people have been displaced in total, and 153 were declared missing.

Flooding began on January 14, 2015, subsiding at the end of the month. Due to the flooding, the soil in some areas became over saturated and caused landslides, leading to more deaths. The rainfall of Southeast Africa was recorded as being 150% higher than normal, flooding roughly 63,000 hectares in total. Through years of research, Africa is said to have shown a complex pattern of rainfall, causing droughts and floods in the same season. Much of the damage from the 2014-2015 rain season can be attributed to the effects of El Niño.

== Effects by country ==
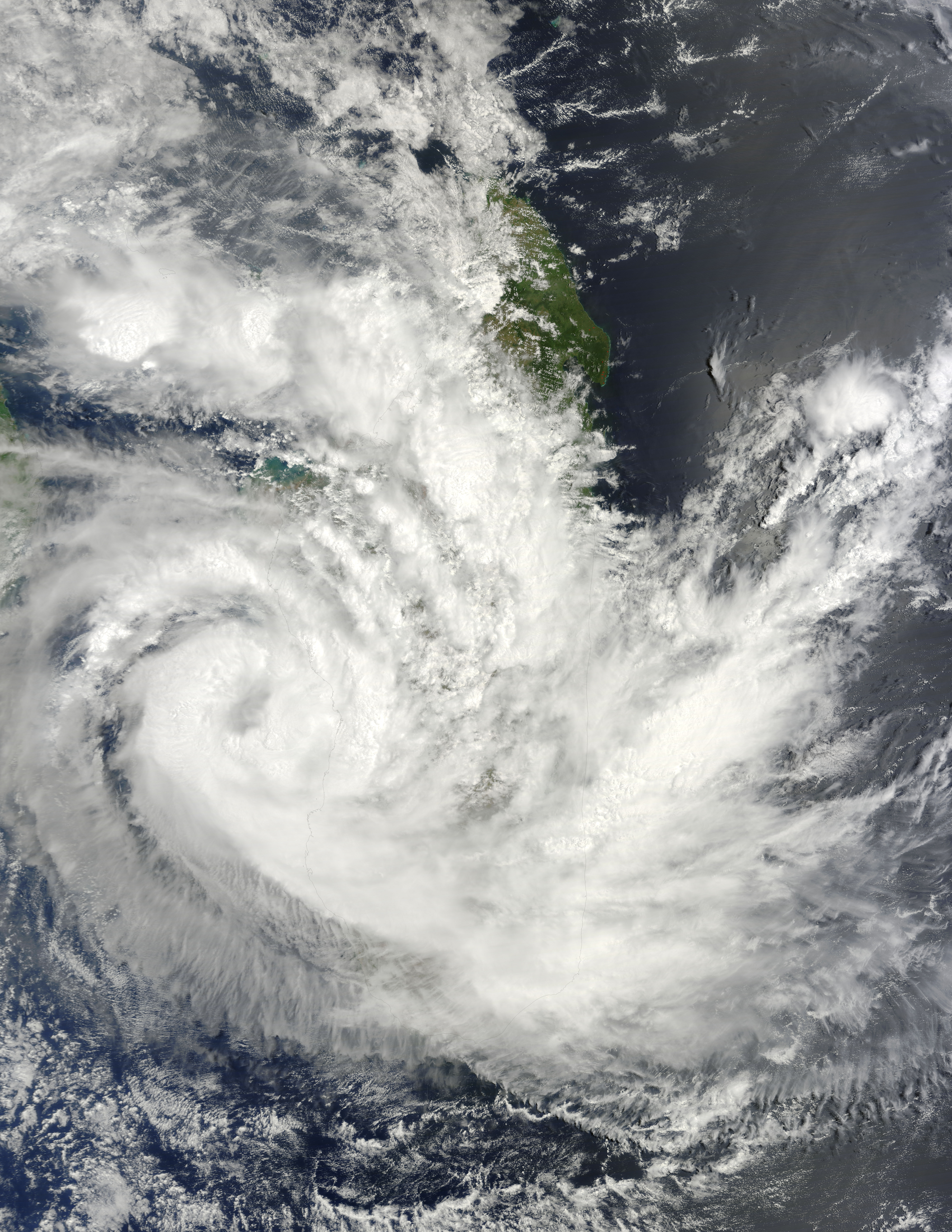
Severe Tropical Storm Chedza on January 16, 2015

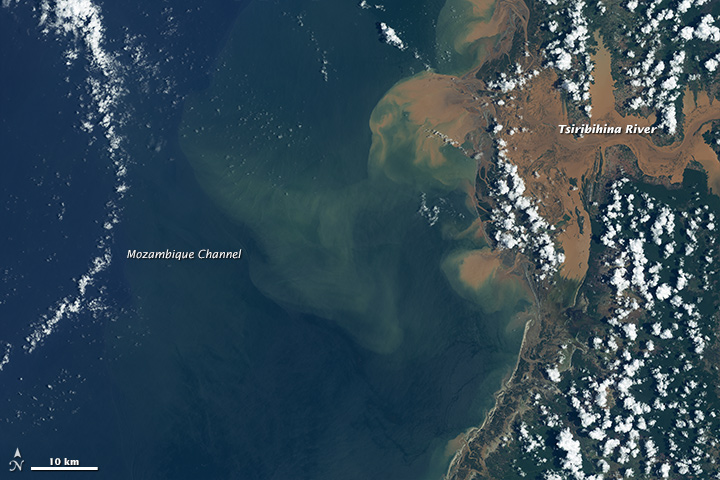
Rivers were swollen and brown with sediment in the wake of Tropical Storm Chedza

| Country | Fatalities | Missing | Displaced |
|---|---|---|---|
| Malawi | 176 | | 230000 |
| Mozambique | 86 | | 160000 |
| Madagascar | 46 | | 20000 |
| Total | 308 | 153 | 410000 |

Location of Madagascar in Africa

Location of Malawi in Africa

Location of Mozambique in Africa

Location of Zimbabwe in Africa

=== Malawi ===
Two weeks of heavy rainfall killed 176 people and caused US$450 million in damage, or roughly 10% of the country's GDP.
