= 2014–15 South-West Indian Ocean cyclone season =

Cyclone season in the Southwest Indian Ocean

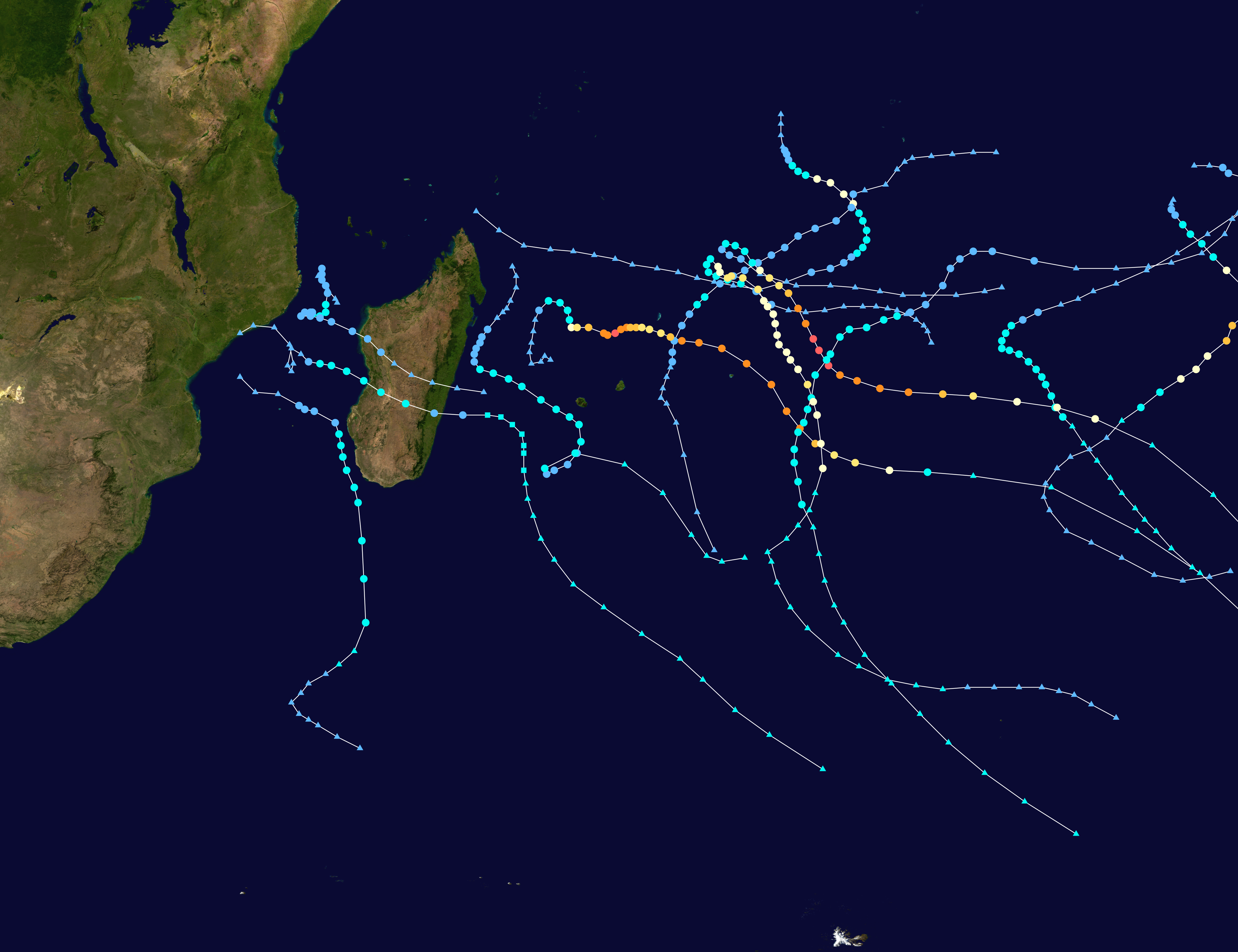
- Season summary map

Seasonal boundaries
- First system formed: November 15, 2014
- Last system dissipated: April 11, 2015

Strongest storm
- By maximum sustained winds: Eunice
  - Maximum winds: 230 km/h (145 mph) (10-minute sustained)
  - Lowest pressure: 915 hPa (mbar)
- By central pressure: Bansi
  - Maximum winds: 220 km/h (140 mph) (10-minute sustained)
  - Lowest pressure: 910 hPa (mbar)

Seasonal statistics
- Total disturbances: 14
- Total depressions: 13
- Total storms: 11
- Tropical cyclones: 4
- Intense tropical cyclones: 3
- Very intense tropical cyclones: 2 (record high, tied with 2013–14 and 2022–23)
- Total fatalities: 111 total
- Total damage: $46.3 million (2015 USD)

Related articles
- 2014–15 Australian region cyclone season; 2014–15 South Pacific cyclone season

The 2014–15 South-West Indian Ocean cyclone season was an above average event in tropical cyclone formation. It began on November 15, 2014, and ended on April 30, 2015, with the exception for Mauritius and the Seychelles, for which it ended on May 15, 2015. These dates conventionally delimit the period of each year when most tropical and subtropical cyclones form in the basin, which is west of 90°E and south of the Equator. Tropical and subtropical cyclones in this basin are monitored by the Regional Specialised Meteorological Centre in Réunion.

== Seasonal summary ==
During October 2014, the Mauritius Meteorological Services issued its seasonal outlook for the summer of 2014–15 and predicted that between ten and twelve named storms would develop during the season. The first tropical disturbance of the season developed on November 16, and quickly developed into the first named storm of the season and was named Adjali by Mauritius. The last tropical storm of this season, Tropical Depression 14, later known as Ikola, strengthened to a Category 1 tropical cyclone before it crossed on the Australian basin the next day. 2 storms, Bansi and Eunice, became Very Intense Tropical Cyclones.

== Systems ==
=== Severe Tropical Storm Adjali ===
- Severe tropical storm (MFR)
- Category 1 tropical cyclone (SSHWS)
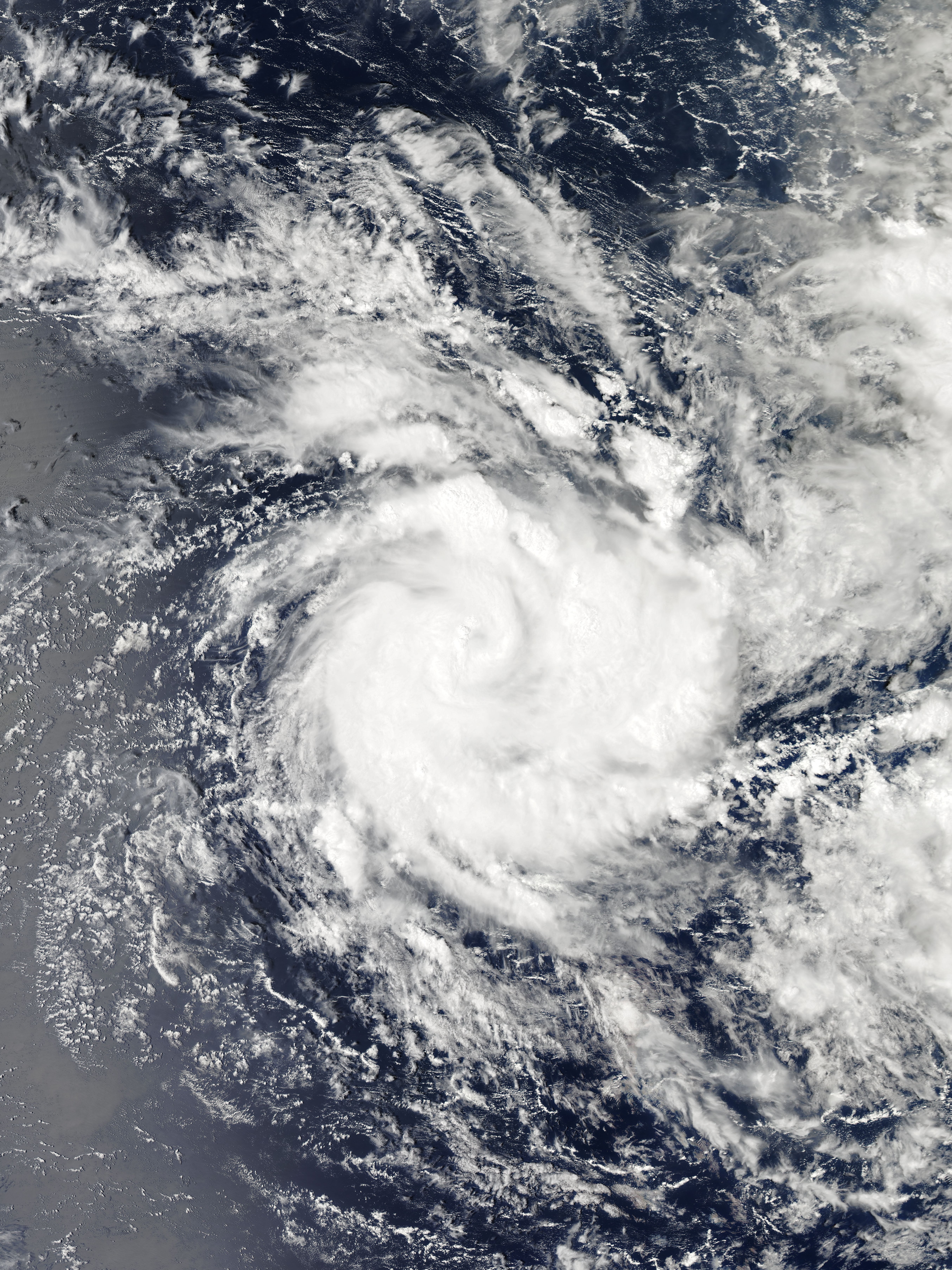
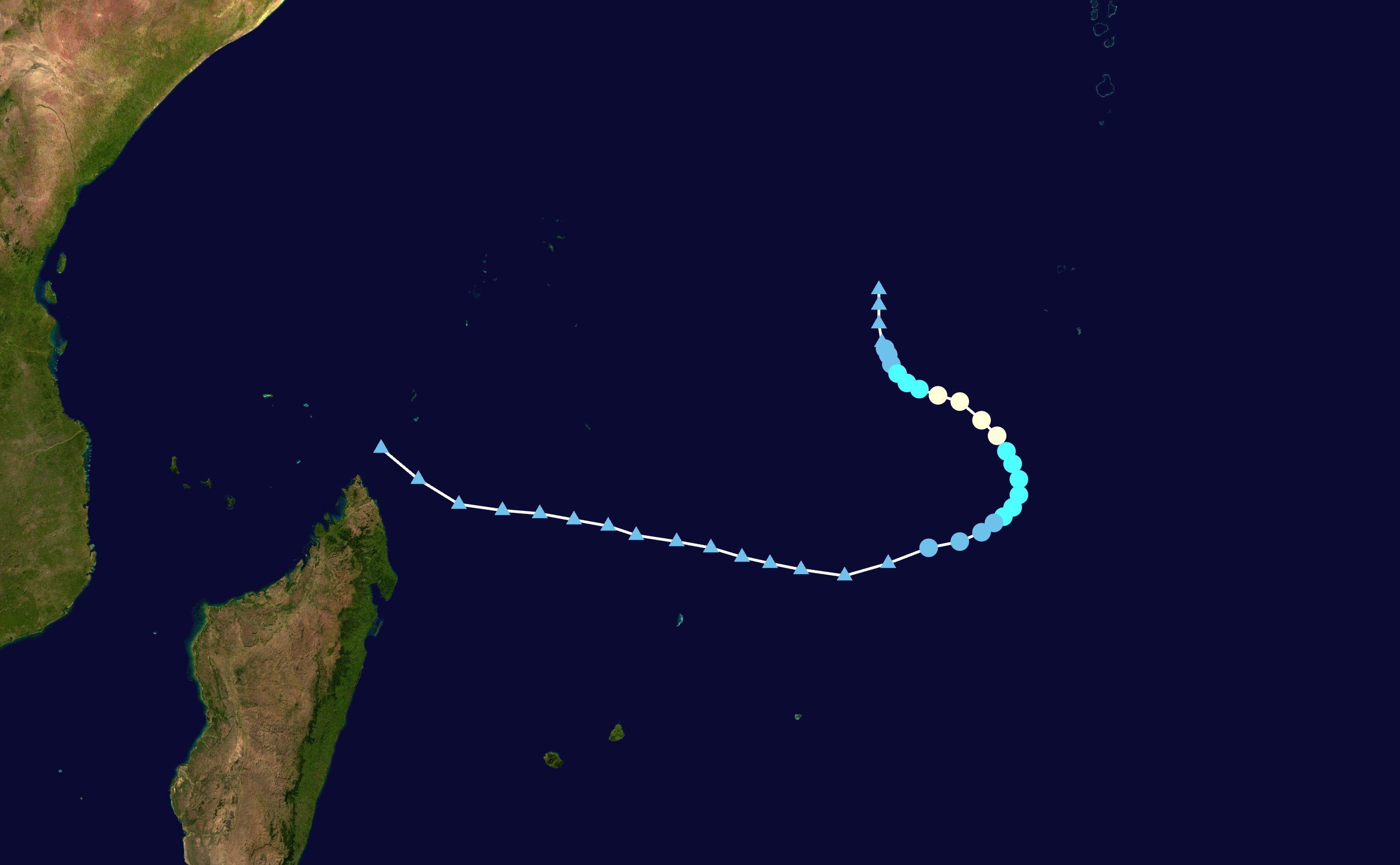
- Duration: November 15 – November 21
- Peak intensity: 110 km/h (70 mph) (10-min); 987 hPa (mbar)

An area of low pressure developed close to Diego Garcia on November 14. It slowly organized as it made a northwest–south-southeast loop over the next two days. By the evening of November 16, the center of the storm became more well defined with convective rainbands wrapped tightly into it. Around that time, RSMC La Réunion started tracking the system as a tropical disturbance, and subsequently upgraded it to a Tropical Depression. Later that day, the JTWC issued a Tropical Cyclone Formation Alert on the system. The depression strengthened further and became the first named tropical storm of the year. On the same day, Mauritius Meteorological Service, which usually names storms in the region, named the system Adjali. The JTWC also initiated advisories on Adjali. On November 17, MFR upgraded it to a Severe Tropical Storm. On November 20, Adjali turned west until reached the northern tip of Madagascar on November 23 and rapidly dissipated. It stayed well from land.

=== Tropical Depression 02 ===
- Tropical depression (MFR)
- Tropical storm (SSHWS)
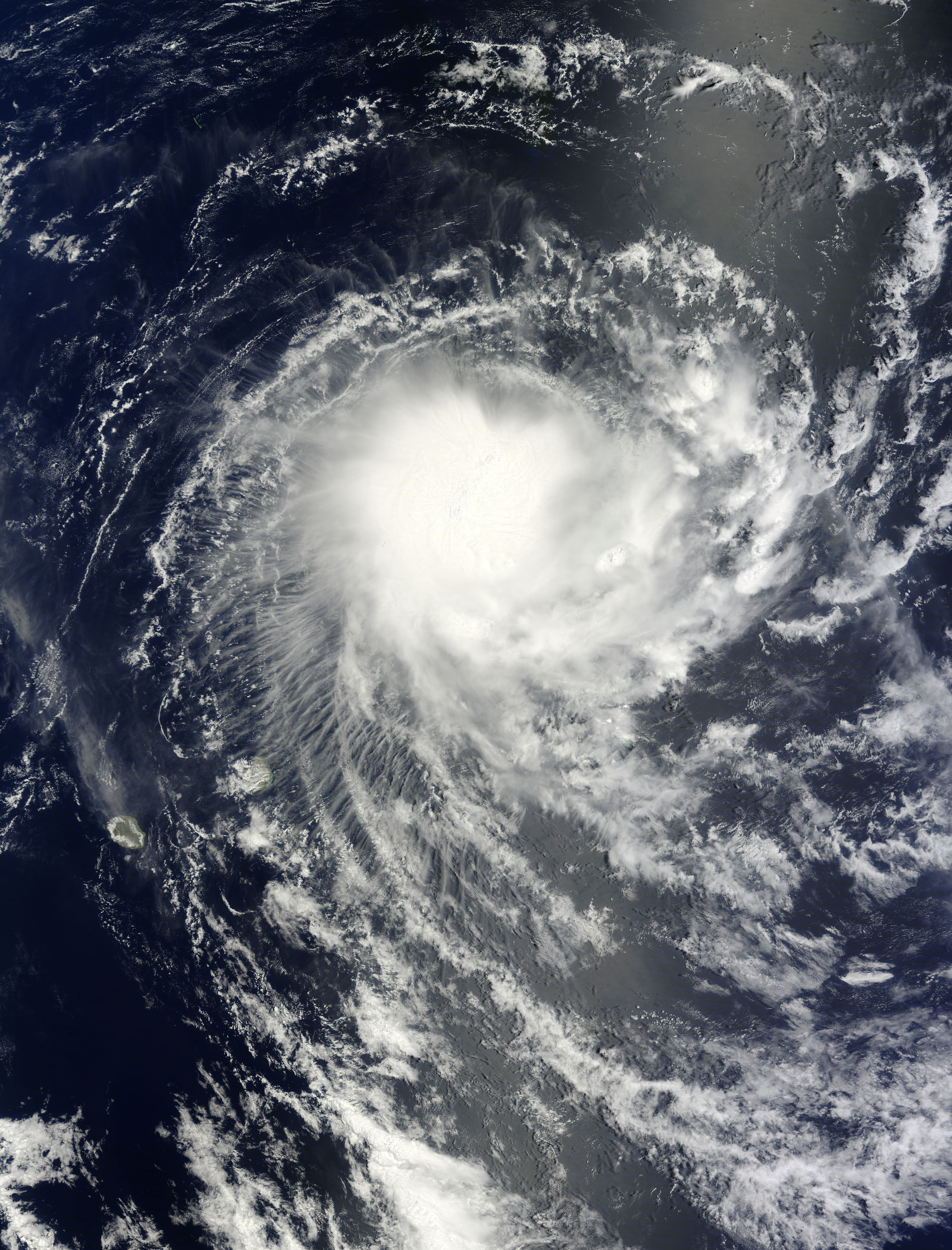
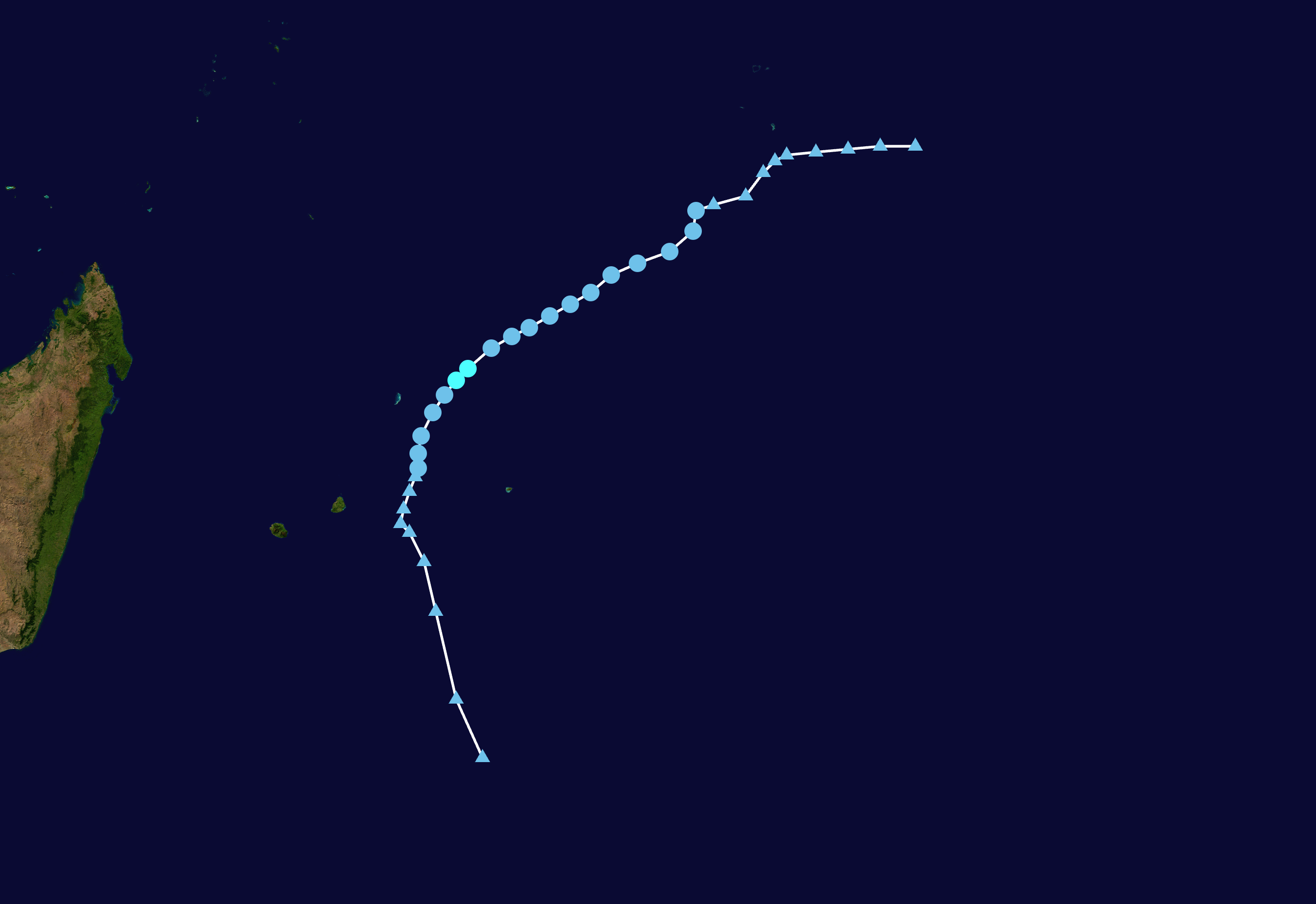
- Duration: November 24 – November 30
- Peak intensity: 60 km/h (35 mph) (10-min); 997 hPa (mbar)

During November 25, RSMC La Réunion reported that Tropical Disturbance 2, had developed within a marginal environment for further development to the northeast of the Mascarene Islands. During that day despite having a low-level circulation centre that was located to the east of the deepest atmospheric convection, the system developed into a tropical depression. The depression continued to intensified as it was classified as a tropical storm by the JTWC early on November 28. The next day, the system moved in a southwestward direction and cooler waters. With this, the MFR downgraded it to a tropical disturbance again on November 29, with the JTWC downgrading it to a tropical depression.

=== Intense Tropical Cyclone Kate ===
- Intense tropical cyclone (MFR)
- Category 3 tropical cyclone (SSHWS)
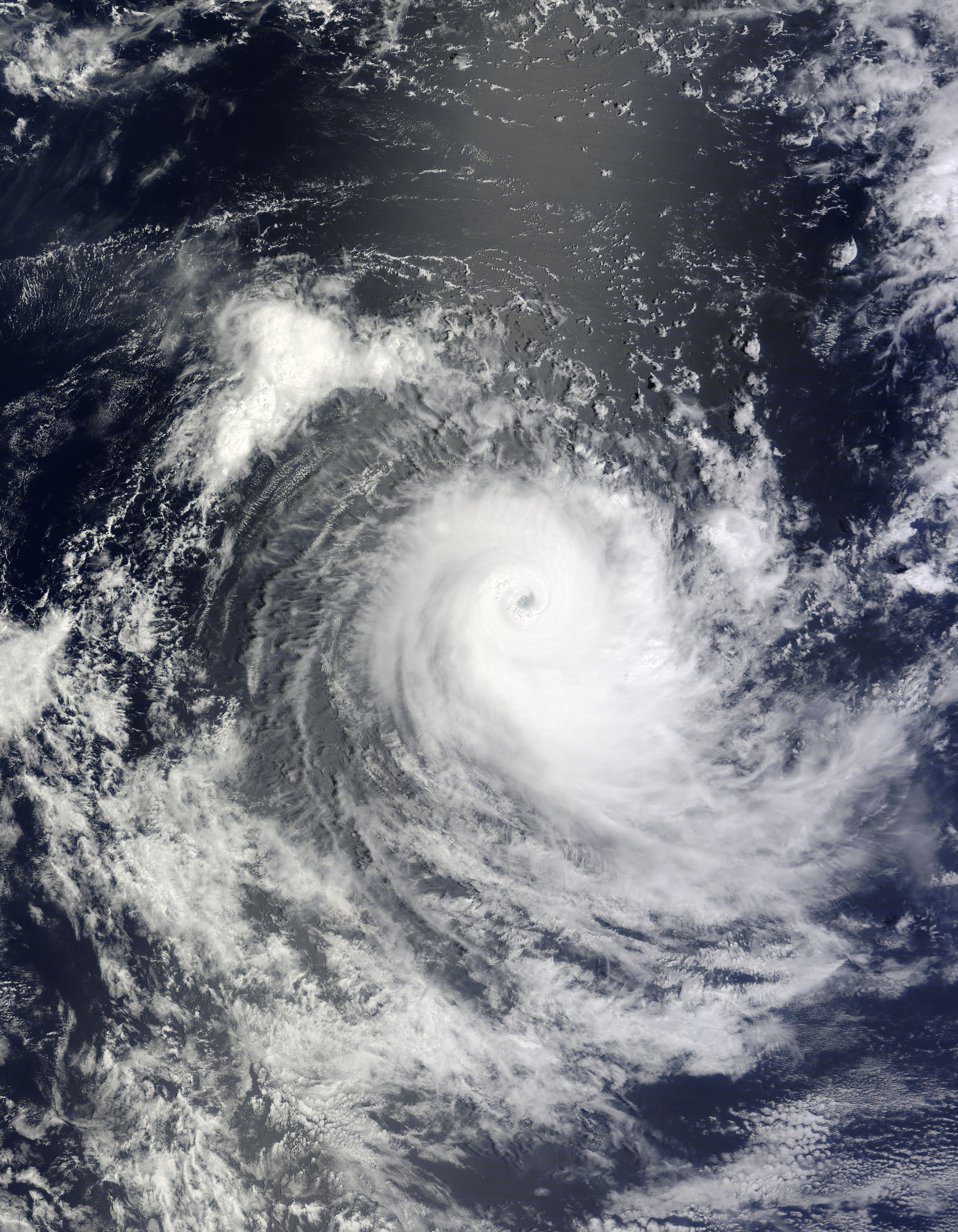
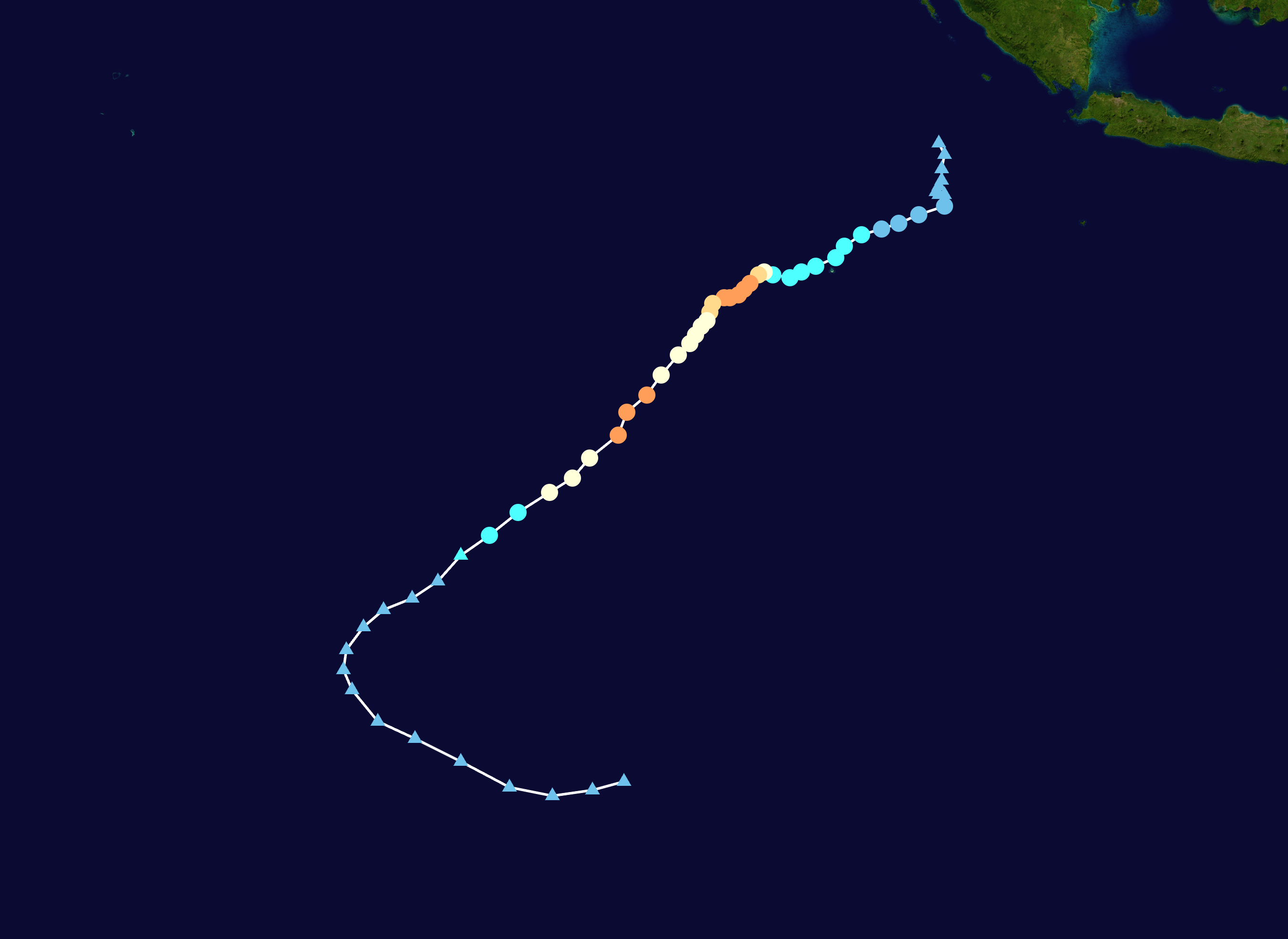
- Duration: December 30 (Entered basin) – December 31
- Peak intensity: 165 km/h (105 mph) (10-min); 950 hPa (mbar)

During December 30, Severe Tropical Cyclone Kate moved into the basin from the Australian region, where it was immediately classified as an intense tropical cyclone with 10-minute sustained wind speeds of 175 km/h (110 mph) by RSMC La Réunion. Over the next day the system rapidly weakened into a tropical storm as it moved into an unfavourable environment for development, before RSMC La Réunion and the JTWC issued their final advisories on the system during December 31.

=== Very Intense Tropical Cyclone Bansi ===
- Very intense tropical cyclone (MFR)
- Category 5 tropical cyclone (SSHWS)
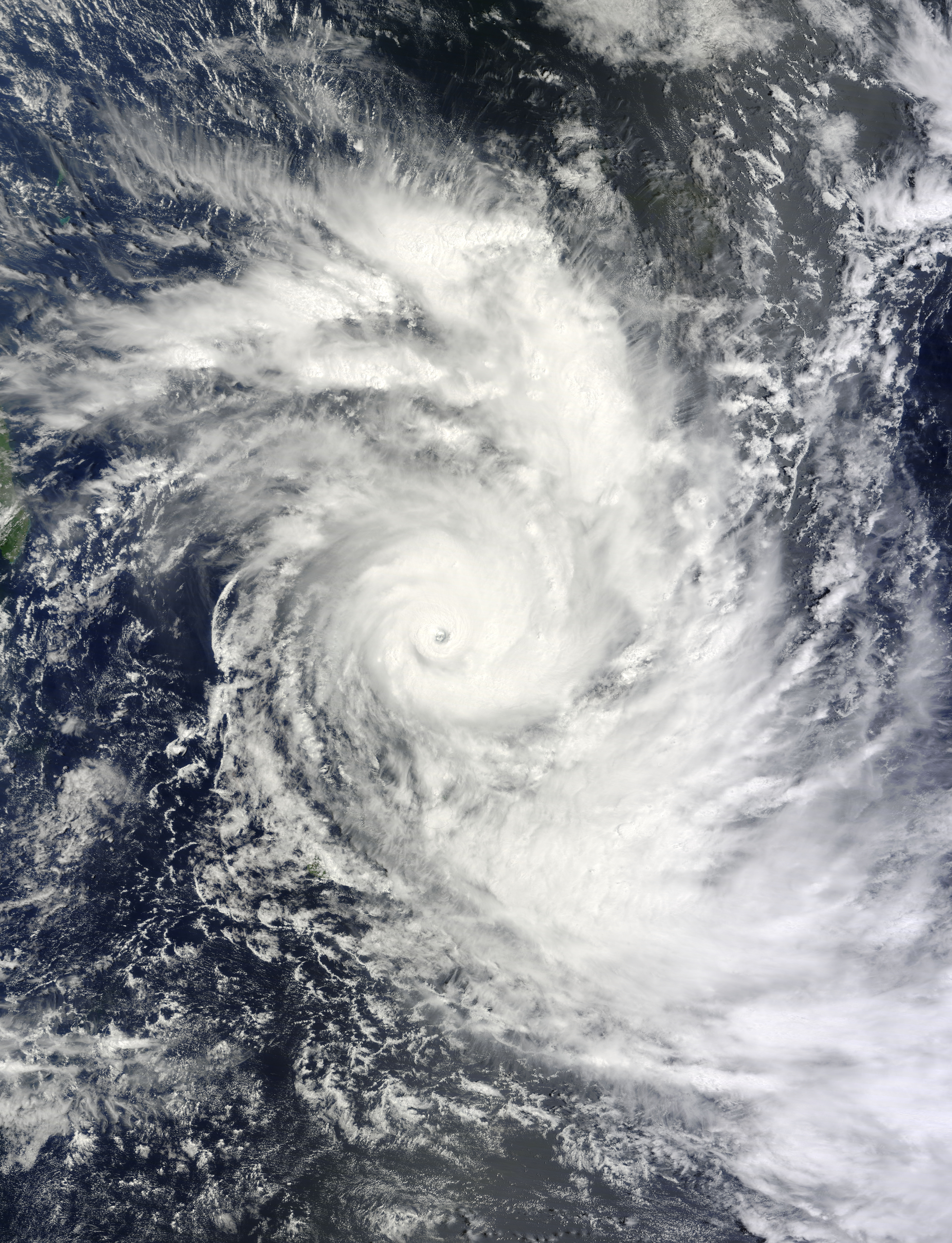
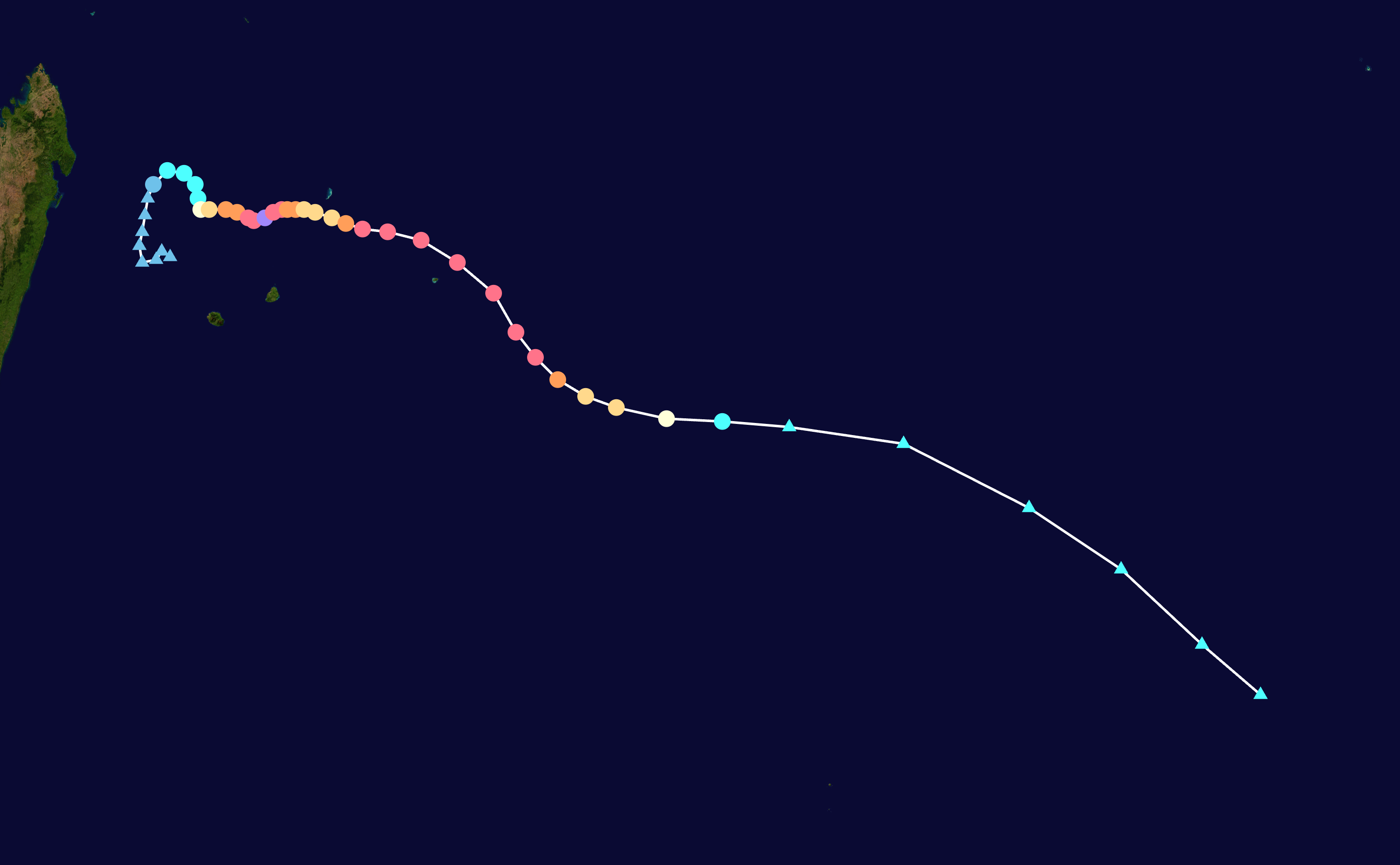
- Duration: January 10 – January 18
- Peak intensity: 220 km/h (140 mph) (10-min); 910 hPa (mbar)

On January 9, the MFR upgraded a low-pressure system east of Madagascar to a zone of disturbed weather, and the system became a tropical disturbance late on the next day. On January 11, the MFR upgraded the system to a tropical depression. Later that day, it intensified into a moderate tropical storm, receiving the name Bansi, whilst the JTWC upgraded it to a tropical storm. In the next day, the MFR upgraded Bansi to a tropical cyclone, as the system formed a ragged eye. On January 13, Bansi explosively intensified into a Category 5 cyclone. However, it soon weakened to a Category 2 on the SSHWS (intense tropical cyclone for MFR) due to an eyewall replacement cycle.

It re-intensified slowly to a Category 4 on the SSHWS as it moved East-Southeast until January 13. Then it slowly curved Southeast and impacted Rodrigues on January 14. Approximately 90 percent of the island was left without power as a result of the storm. Some flooding occurred and 115 people sought refuge in shelters. From this moment onwards it started weakening gradually at first, but then deteriorated quickly. On January 16, Bansi began to undergo an extratropical transition. Consequently, the MFR and JTWC issued Bansi's final warning, as Bansi was absorbed by an extratropical cyclone to the northeast.

=== Severe Tropical Storm Chedza ===
- Severe tropical storm (MFR)
- Tropical storm (SSHWS)
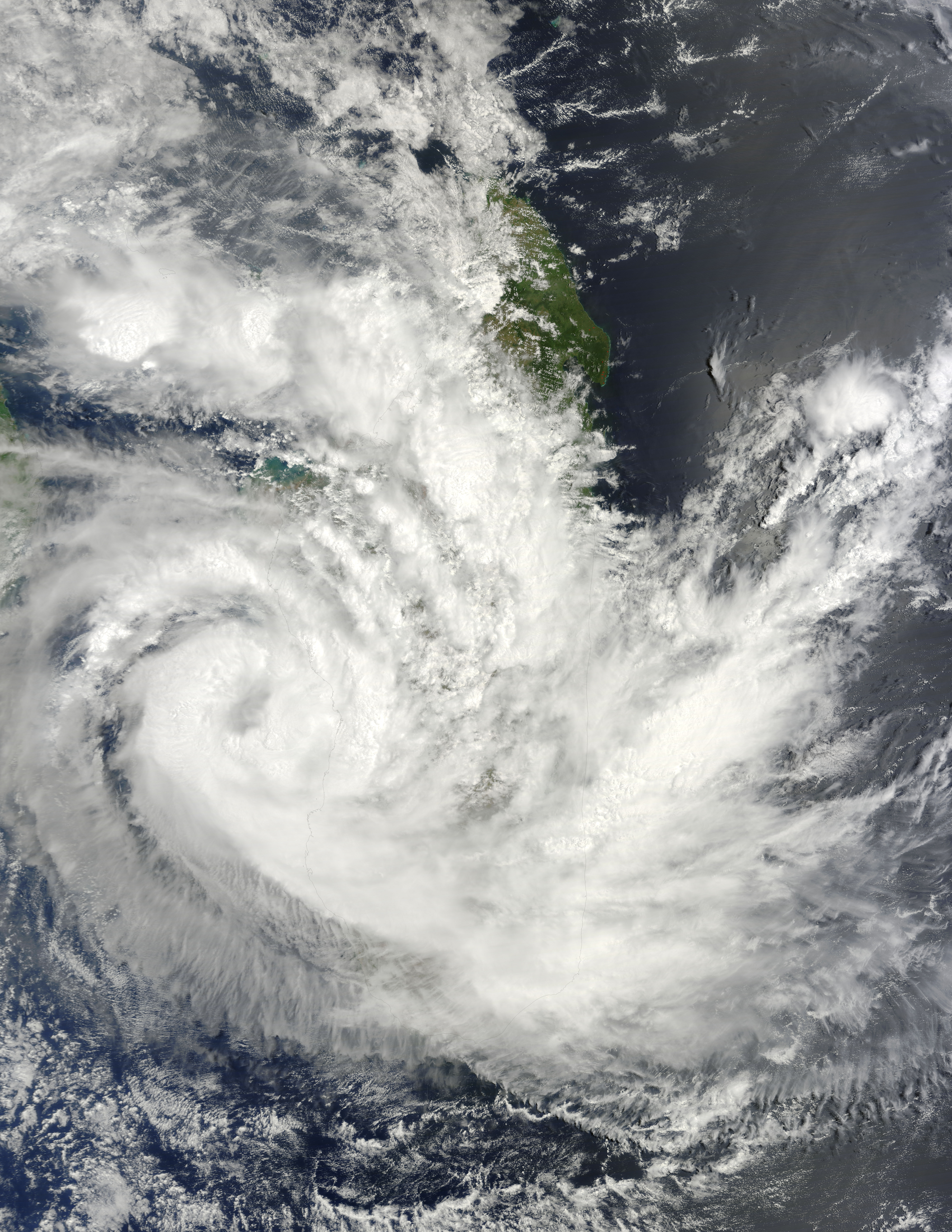
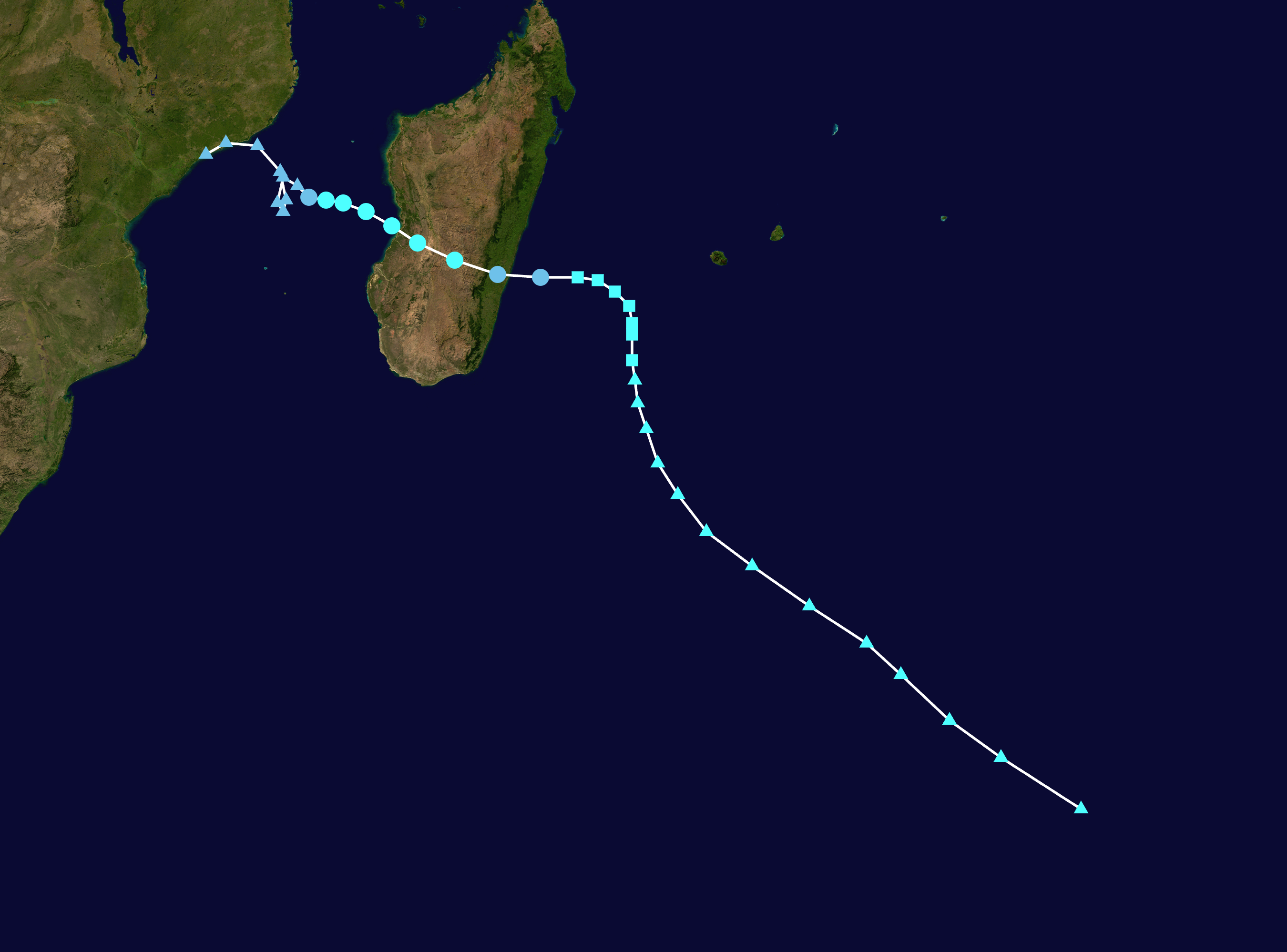
- Duration: January 14 – January 19
- Peak intensity: 105 km/h (65 mph) (10-min); 975 hPa (mbar)

On January 11, the JTWC started to monitor a weak tropical disturbance inland over Mozambique. On January 14, the MFR upgraded a low-pressure system east of Mozambique to a zone of disturbed weather, and the system became a tropical disturbance late on the same day. On January 15, the MFR upgraded the system to a tropical depression. Later next day, it intensified into a moderate tropical storm, receiving the name Chedza, whilst the JTWC upgraded it to a tropical storm. On the same day, MFR upgraded it to a Severe Tropical Storm. Later that day, it made landfall over Madagascar. On January 17, it left Madagascar and went to the South-West Indian Ocean. On the next day, it re-intensified to a Severe Tropical Storm. On January 19, Chedza began to undergo an extratropical transition. Consequently, the MFR issued Chedza's final warning.

The formative stages of Chedza brought rainfall to an already flooded region across southeastern Africa. Weeks of heavy rainfall killed 117 people in Mozambique and 104 in neighboring Malawi, where it was the worst flood in 24 years. In Madagascar, Chedza struck after weeks of heavy rainfall, causing rivers to increase and flooding widespread areas of crop fields. In the capital city of Antananarivo, the deluge damaged the main water pump that controlled water levels in the region. The rainfall caused mudslides and damaged roads. Across the country, flooding from Chedza displaced 54,792 people, after destroying 4,430 houses and flooding another 3,442, mostly in Vatovavy-Fitovinany in the southeastern portion. Chedza killed 80 people and caused about $40 million in damage (2015 USD). Later, the storm brought heavy rainfall and strong winds to the mountainous peaks of Réunion.

=== Moderate Tropical Storm Diamondra ===
- Moderate tropical storm (MFR)
- Tropical storm (SSHWS)
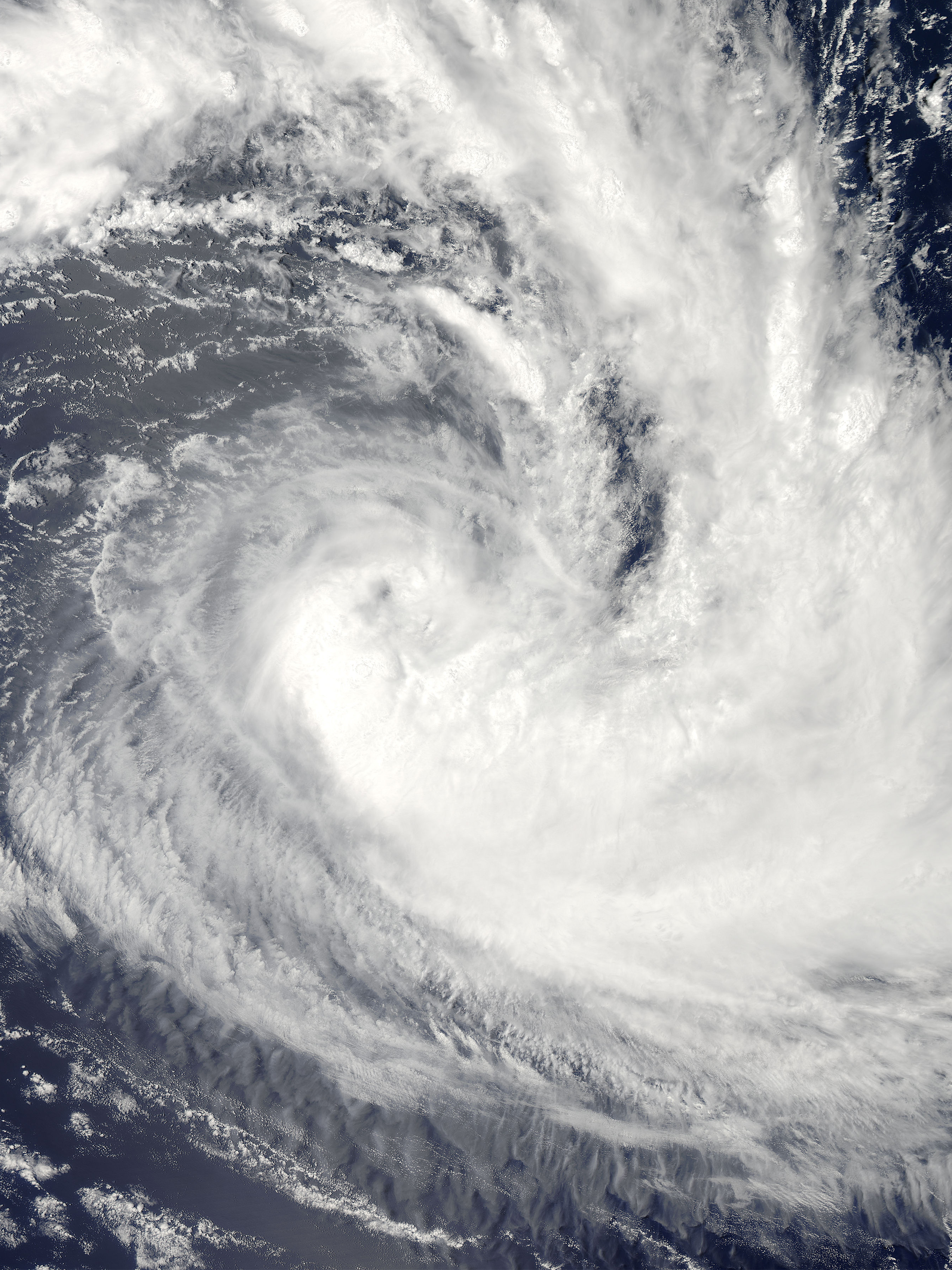
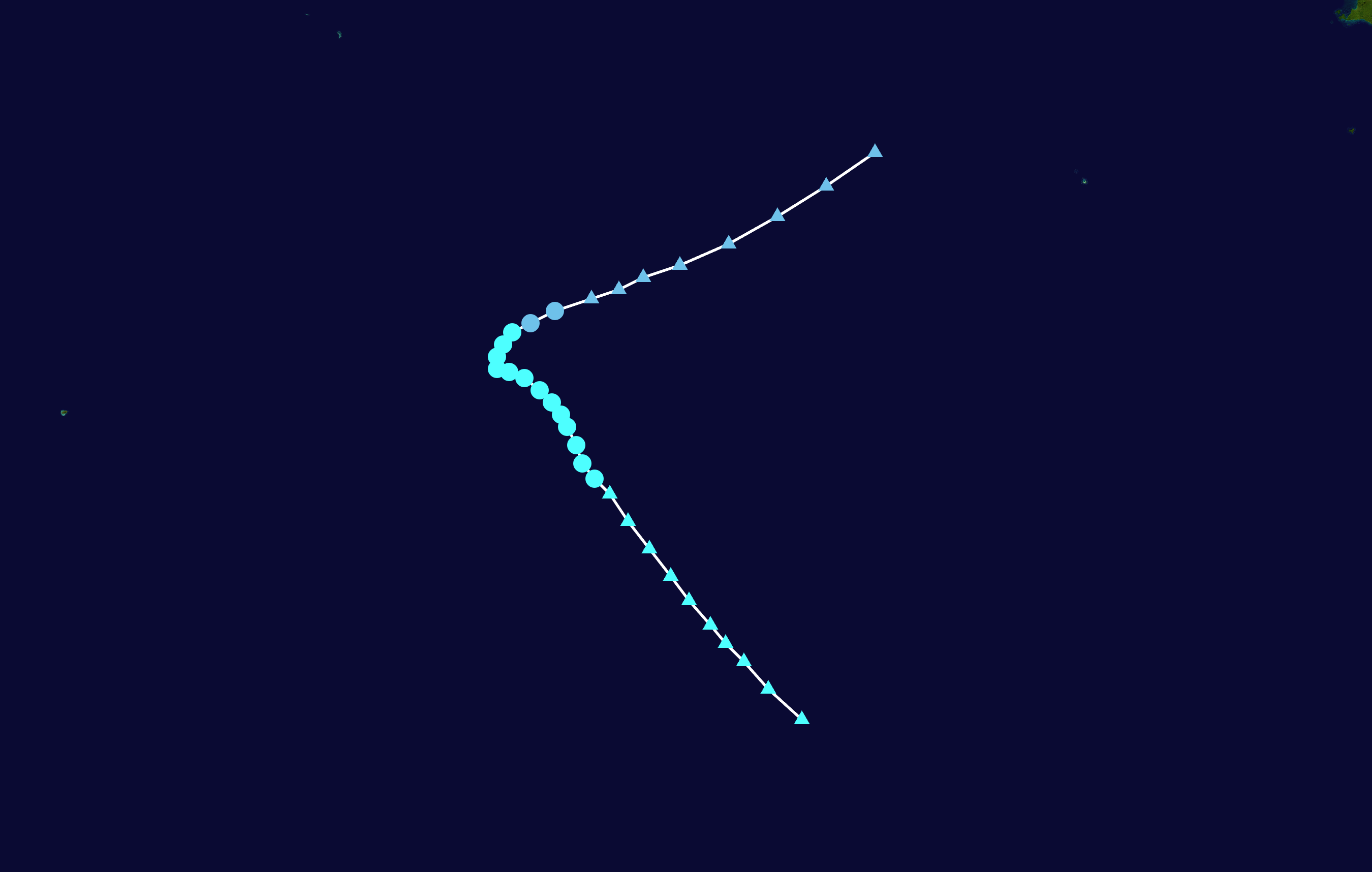
- Duration: January 26 – January 30
- Peak intensity: 85 km/h (50 mph) (10-min); 986 hPa (mbar)

On January 26, a tropical low formed east-southeast of Diego Garcia. It slowly moved towards it, before the MFR upgraded the low into a zone of disturbed weather. Later that day, the area of disturbed weather intensified into a depression, as the MFR and JTWC issued their initial advisories, and designated it as 08S. On January 27, MFR reported that Tropical Depression 08S intensified into a moderate tropical storm, and so was issued the name Diamondra. Later that day, Diamondra continued to strengthen, and late on January 28, Diamondra reached moderate tropical storm intensity. Diamondra weakened, after moving over cooler waters. Late on January 29, Diamondra continued to weaken, so JTWC issued Diamondra's final warning. On January 30, Diamondra began to undergo an extratropical transition. Two days later, it was reported that Diamondra had become extratropical, and MFR announced their final advisory on the system soon after.

=== Very Intense Tropical Cyclone Eunice ===
- Very intense tropical cyclone (MFR)
- Category 5 tropical cyclone (SSHWS)
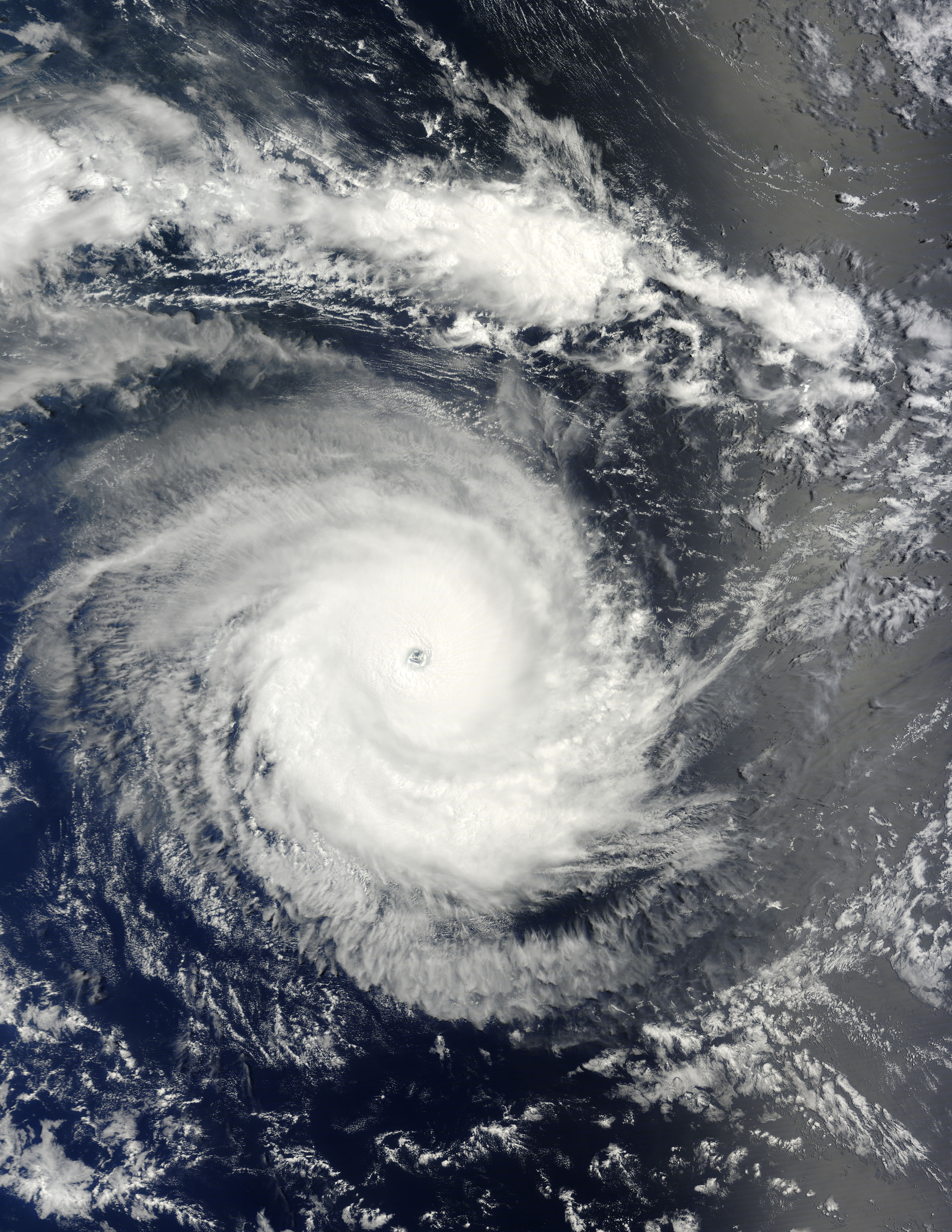
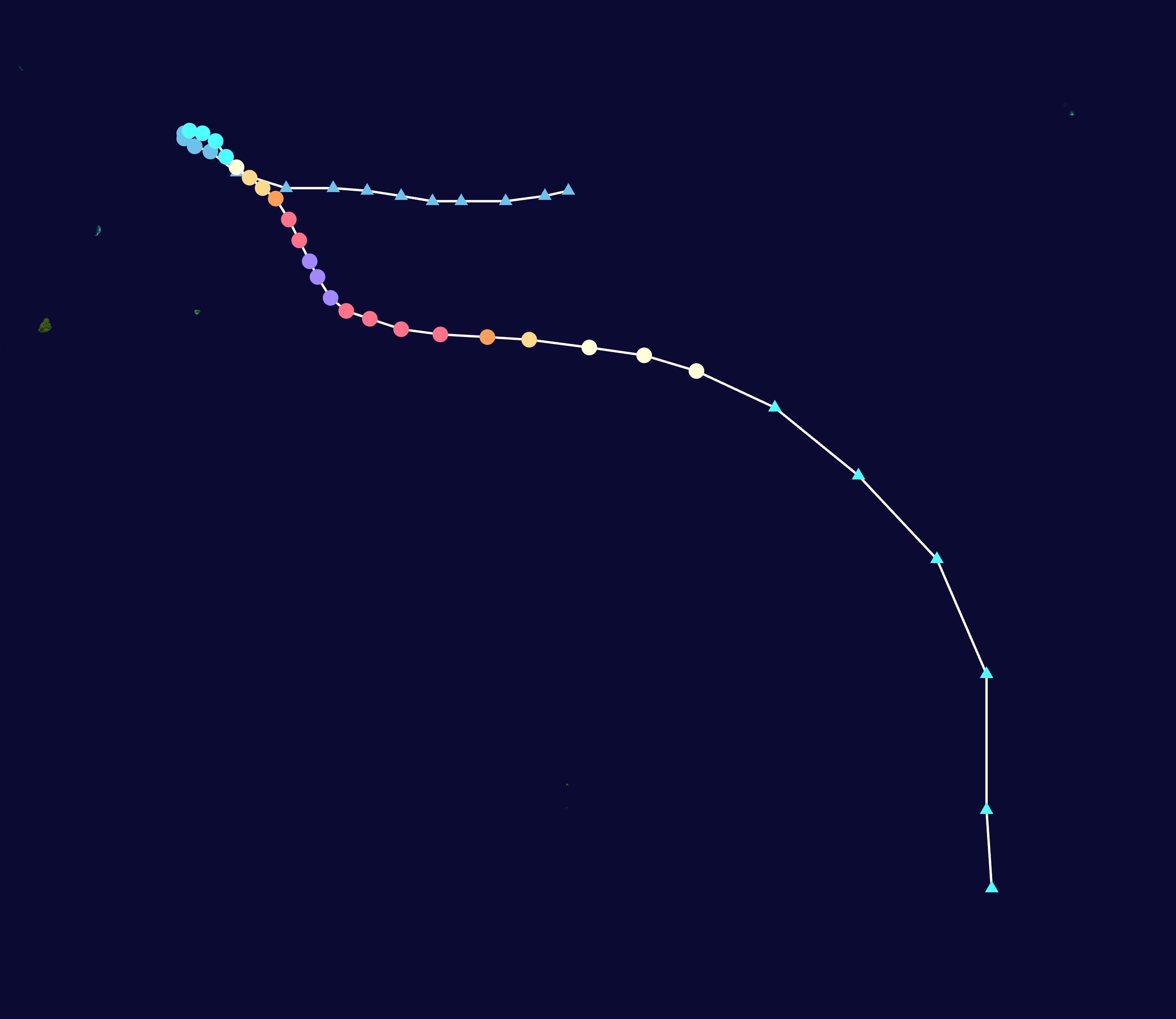
- Duration: January 27 – February 1
- Peak intensity: 230 km/h (145 mph) (10-min); 915 hPa (mbar)

On January 27, RSMC La Réunion reported that Tropical Disturbance 08, had developed to the northeast of Mauritius. Later that day, the JTWC issued its initial warnings and designated it as 09S. On January 28, MFR reported that Tropical Depression 09S intensified into a moderate tropical storm, as MFR named it Eunice. Then Eunice moved from north to southeast, before Eunice intensified into a severe tropical storm, according to MFR. The JTWC upgraded Eunice into a Category 2 tropical cyclone, while the MFR upgraded Eunice to a tropical cyclone. After a period of rapid intensification, Eunice was classified as a very intense tropical cyclone by the MFR and a Category 5 (1 min 260 kmh)-equivalent tropical cyclone by the JTWC. The next day, Eunice weakened to an intense tropical cyclone as it underwent an eyewall replacement cycle. On February 2, Eunice began to undergo an extratropical transition. One day later, MFR announced their final advisory on the system.

=== Severe Tropical Storm Fundi ===
- Severe tropical storm (MFR)
- Tropical storm (SSHWS)
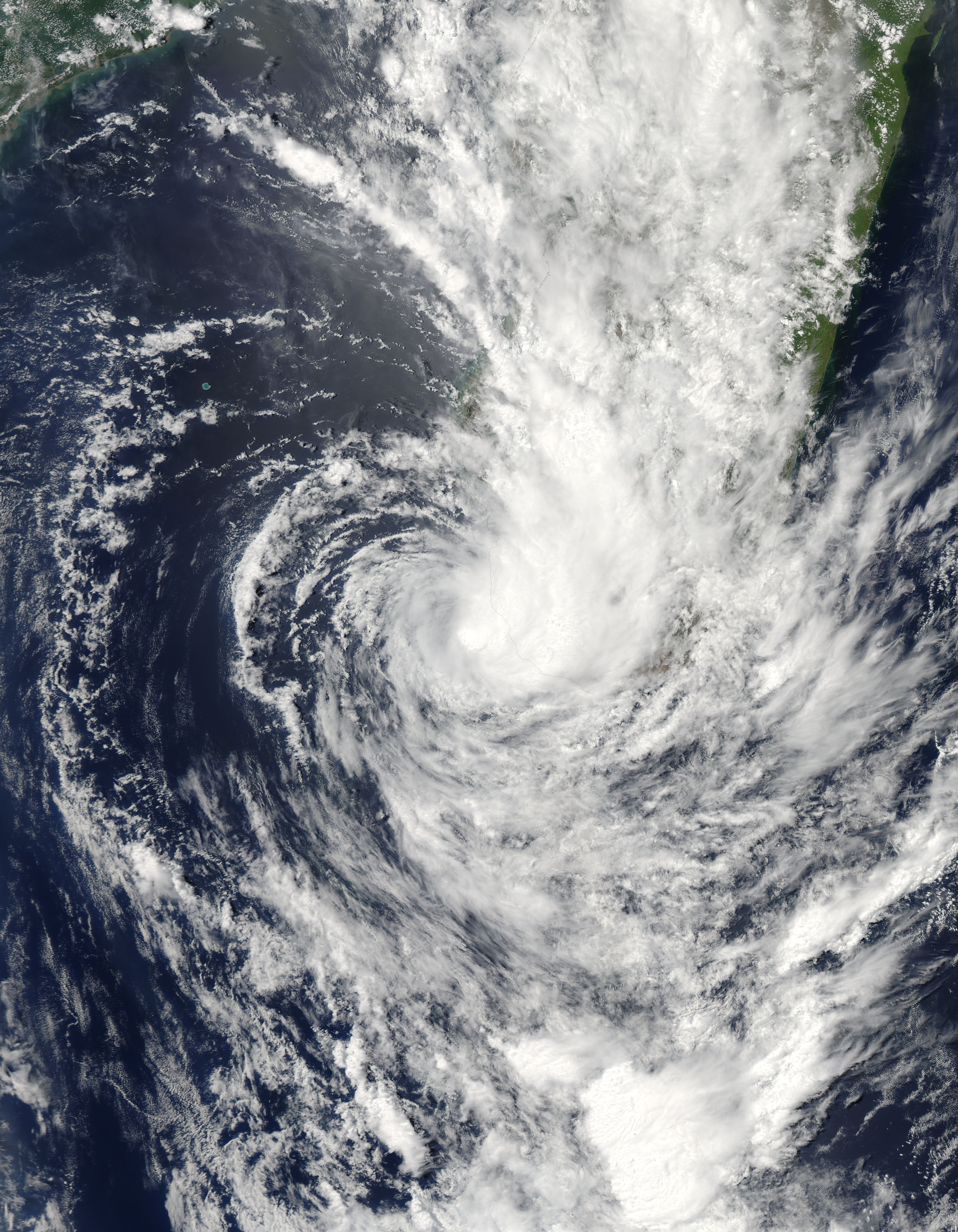
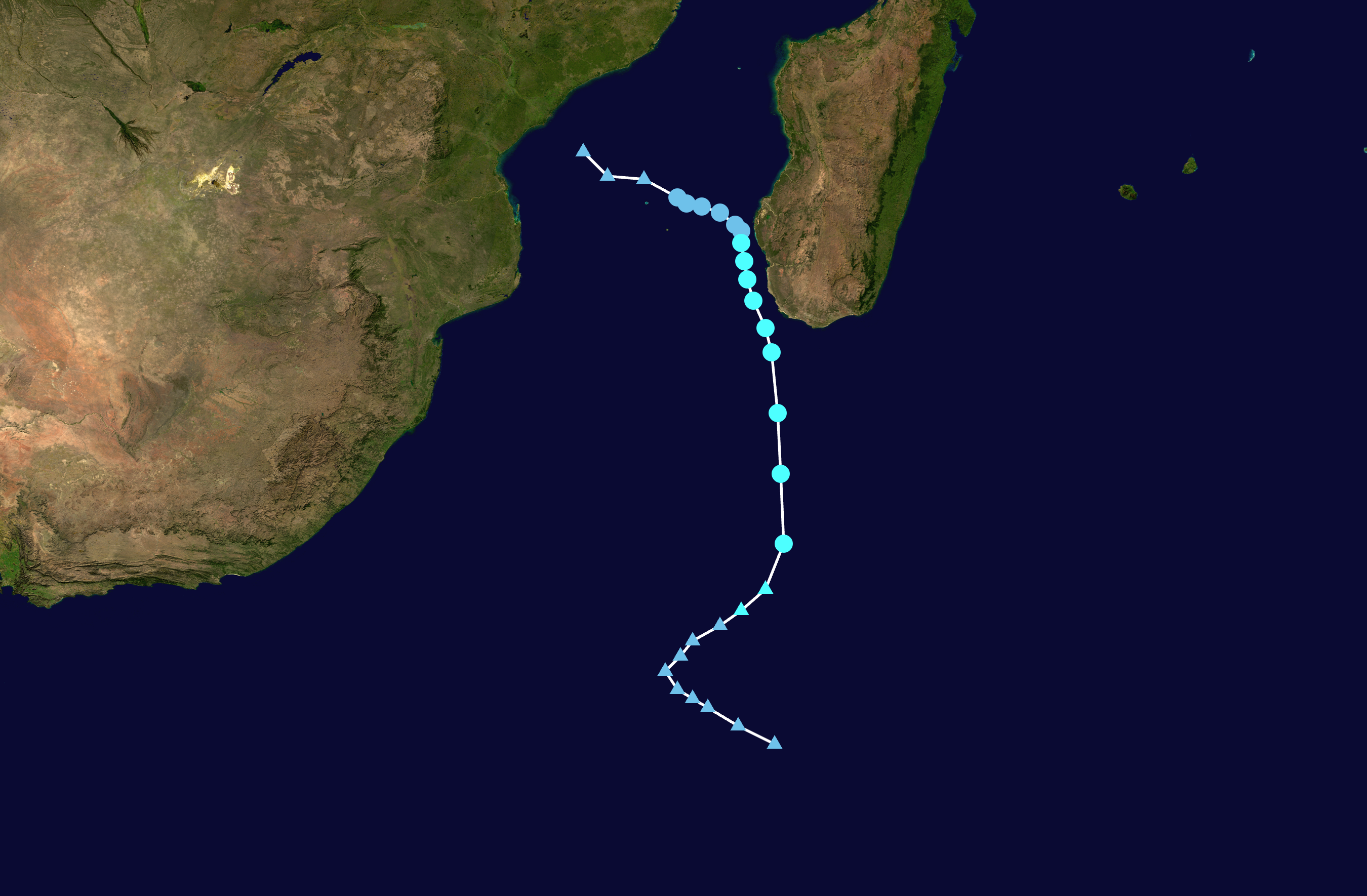
- Duration: February 5 – February 8
- Peak intensity: 100 km/h (65 mph) (10-min); 978 hPa (mbar)

Similar to the formation of Chedza, a weak tropical disturbance developed near shore over southern Mozambique on February 4. On February 5, the MFR upgraded a low-pressure system east of Mozambique to a zone of disturbed weather. On February 6, the MFR upgraded the system to a tropical depression. Later same day, it intensified into a moderate tropical storm, receiving the name Fundi, whilst the JTWC upgraded it to a tropical storm. Fundi weakened, after moving over cooler waters. Late on February 8, Fundi continued to weaken, so JTWC issued Fundi's final warning. On February 9, Fundi began to undergo an extratropical transition. Same day later, it was reported that Fundi had become extratropical, and MFR announced their final advisory on the system soon after.

While in its formative stages, the storm brought rainfall to southwestern Madagascar, totaling 109 mm (4.3 in) in Tulear. Severe floods impacted the city of Toliara, killing five people and affecting 1,200 homes. The effects of Fundi in Madagascar worsened the situation in areas still recovering from Severe Tropical Storm Chedza the previous month.

=== Severe Tropical Storm Glenda ===
- Severe tropical storm (MFR)
- Tropical storm (SSHWS)
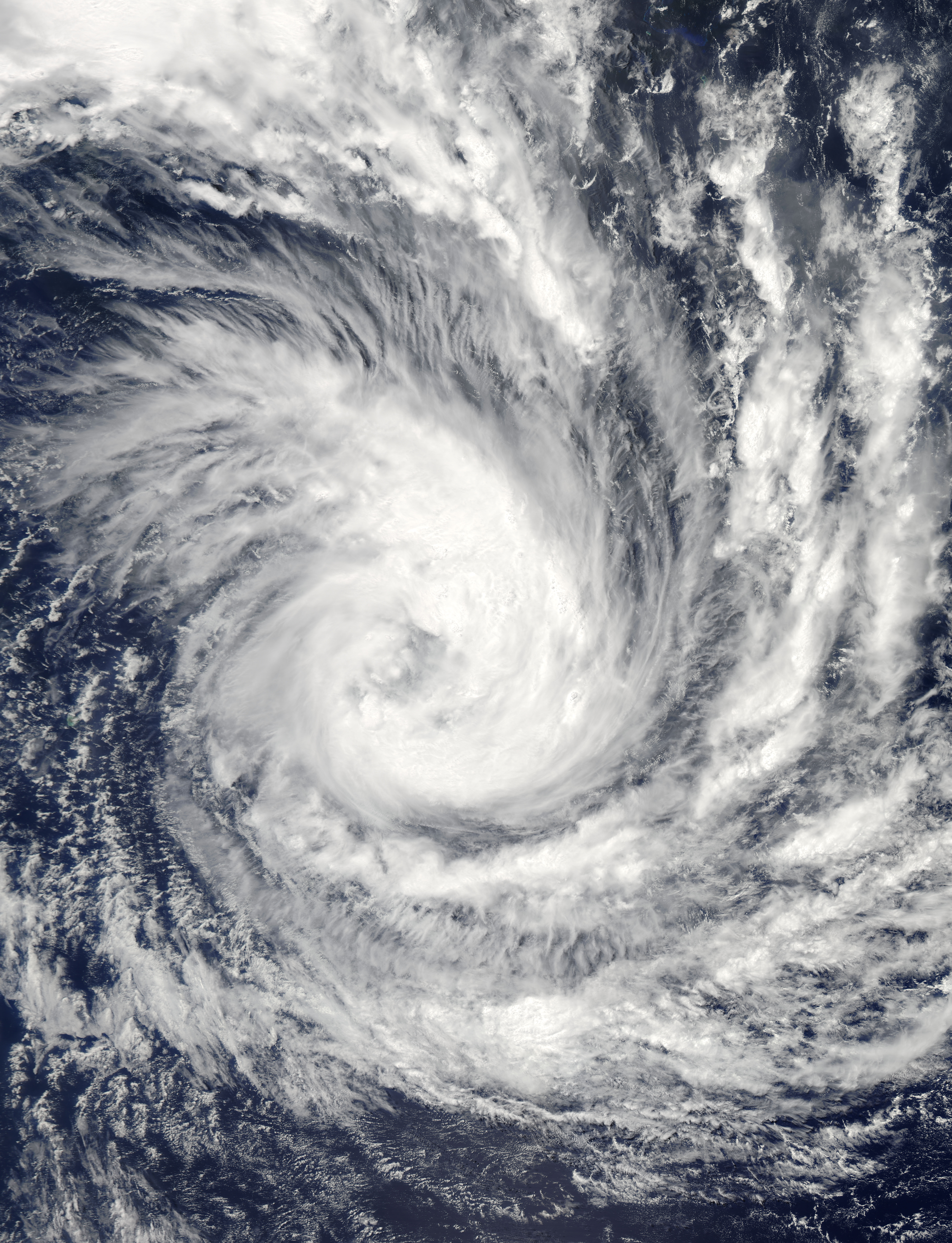
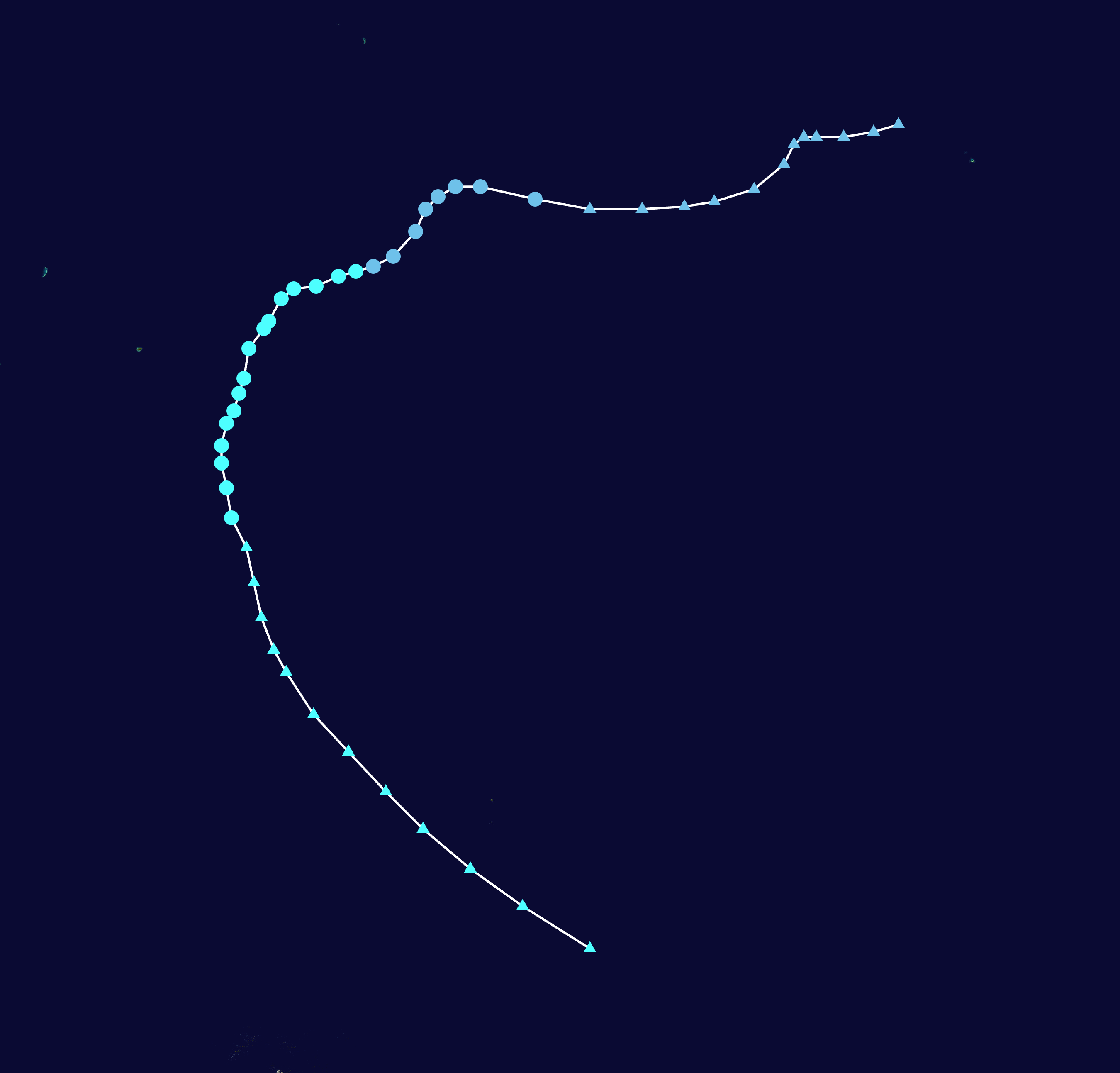
- Duration: February 22 – February 28
- Peak intensity: 95 km/h (60 mph) (10-min); 974 hPa (mbar)

On February 22, a tropical low formed on open seas of the Indian Ocean east of Diego Garcia. It moved westwards, before the MFR upgraded it into a zone of disturbed weather. Then it got upgraded into Tropical Disturbance 10 later. The disturbance continued to move in a westerly direction as the JTWC issued a Tropical Cyclone Formation Alert on the system. On February 24, the system gradually intensified into a tropical depression, whilst the JTWC upgraded it into a tropical storm. However, the MFR upgraded the depression into a moderate tropical storm, which was then named Glenda. It intensified slightly because of favourable conditions for further development, within moderate vertical wind shear. On February 25, the storm continued to intensify, and it reached peak intensity. It quickly weakened the next day, and continued to weaken on February 28, and it lost its energy on March 1. Thereafter, MFR announced their final advisory on the system soon after.

=== Tropical Depression 11 ===
- Tropical depression (MFR)
- Tropical storm (SSHWS)
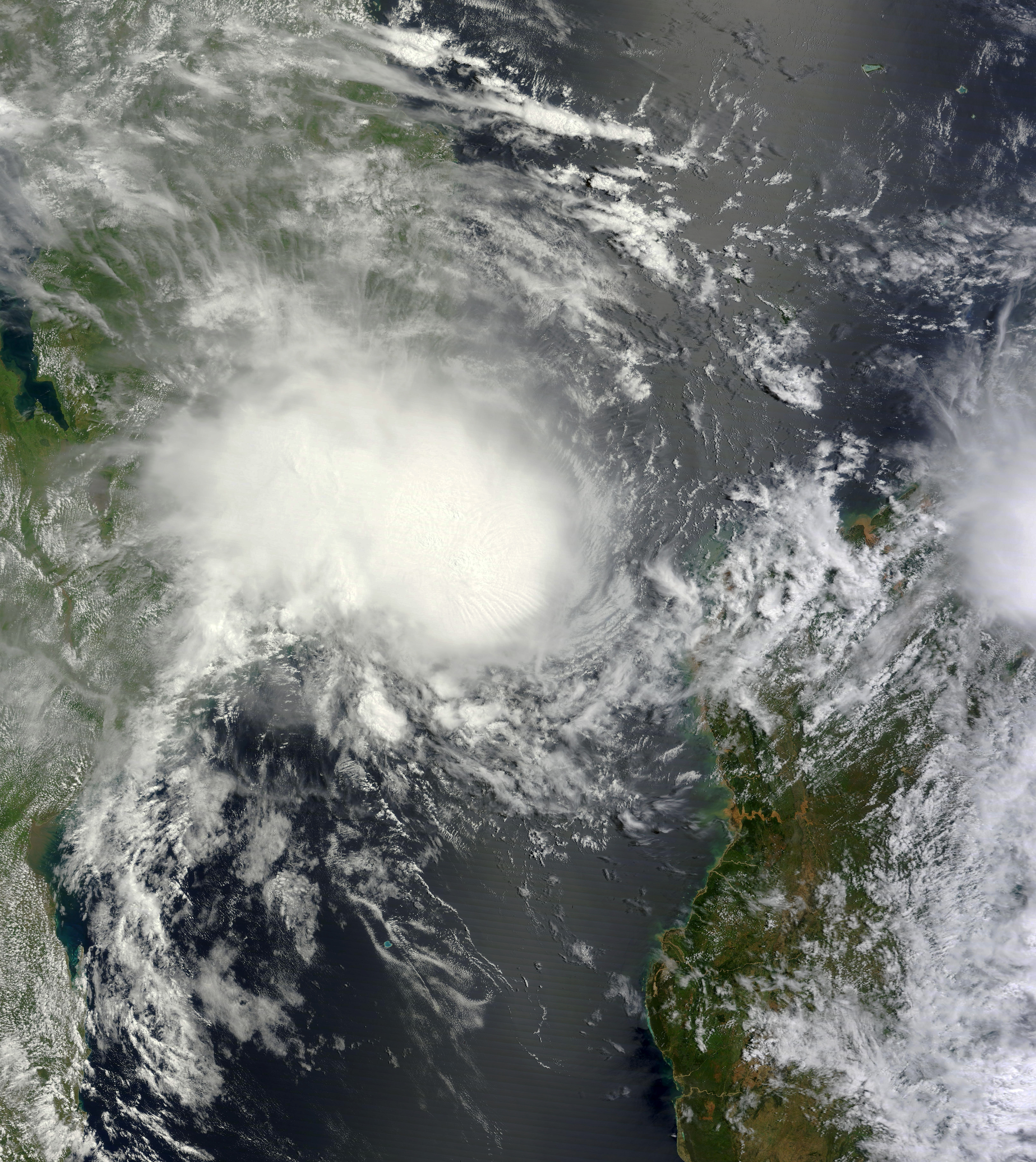
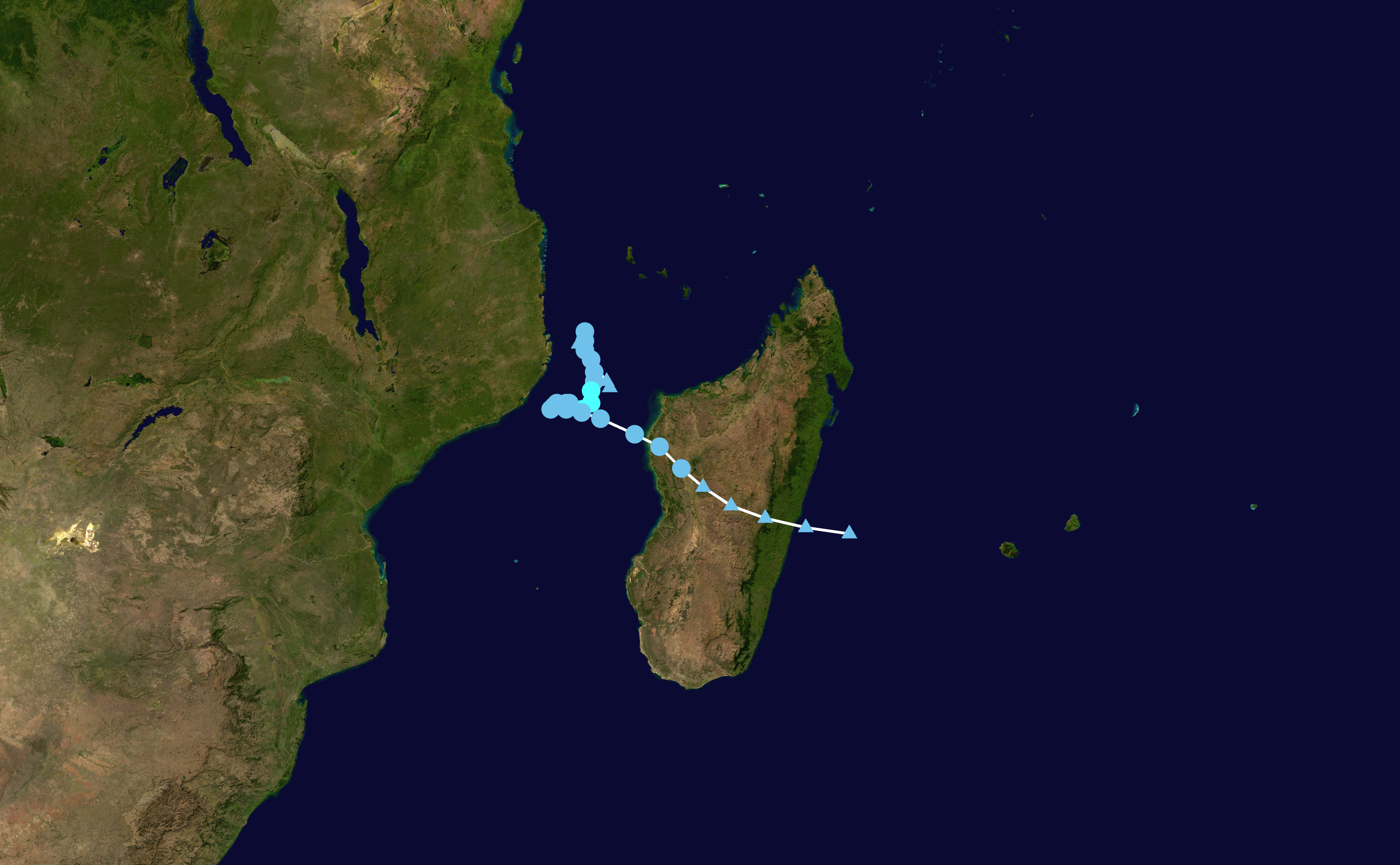
- Duration: March 4 – March 7
- Peak intensity: 55 km/h (35 mph) (10-min); 998 hPa (mbar)

On March 5, the JTWC started issuing advisories on a tropical system over the Mozambique Channel and was designated as 15S. The next day, RSMC La Réunion reported that it had intensified into Tropical Depression 11. On March 7, the system moved in a westward direction and near shore. With this, the MFR downgraded it to a tropical disturbance again on the same day, with the JTWC downgrading it to a tropical depression and issued its final warning. It continued to weaken on the next day, so MFR announced their final advisory on the system soon after.

=== Moderate Tropical Storm Haliba ===
- Moderate tropical storm (MFR)
- Tropical storm (SSHWS)
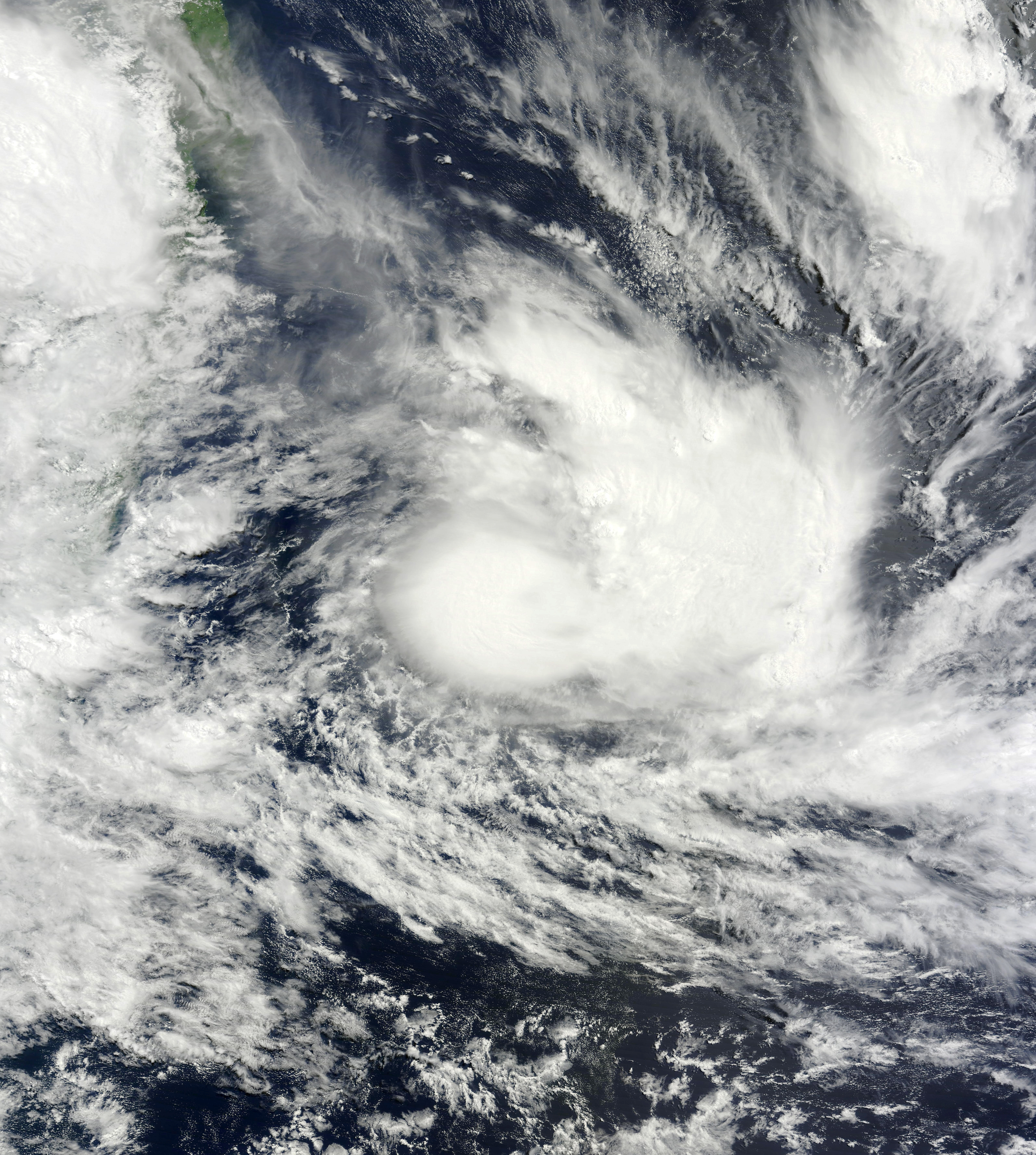
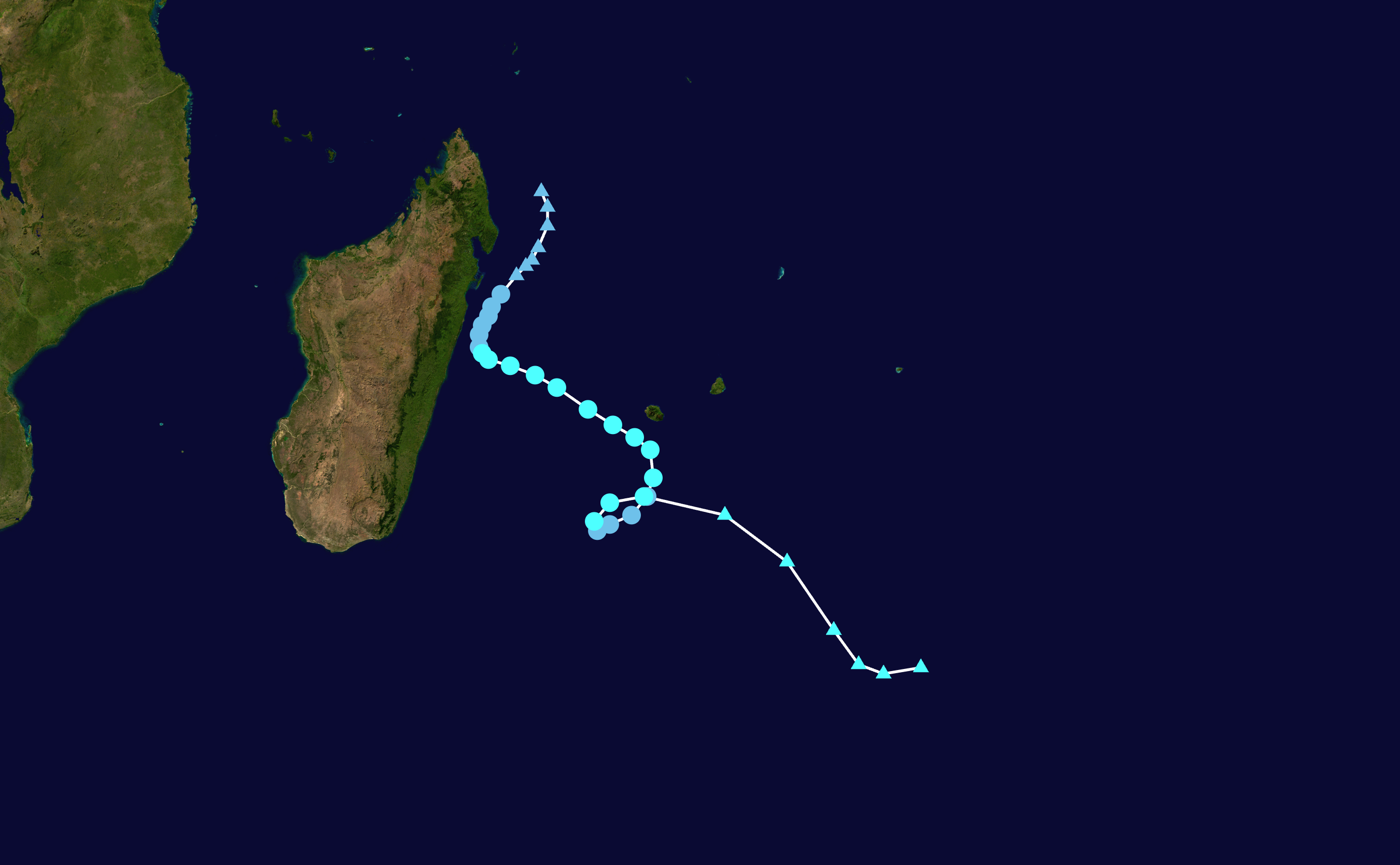
- Duration: March 7 – March 10
- Peak intensity: 85 km/h (50 mph) (10-min); 993 hPa (mbar)

On March 7, a tropical disturbance formed east of Madagascar. It intensified into a zone of disturbed weather and became a tropical disturbance. It became Tropical Depression 12 by MFR, within the JTWC's designation 16S on March 8, and became Moderate Tropical Storm Haliba. The next day, Haliba continued to intensify.

During the early stages of Haliba's development it produced heavy rains across eastern Madagascar, resulting in severe flooding. A total of 26 people lost their lives on the island while approximately 96,000 people were affected, 39,000 of whom were rendered homeless. Roughly 13,000 hectares (32,000 acres) of rice fields were destroyed. Torrential rains also affected Mauritius for three days, leading to damaging floods. A 24‑hour rainfall of 135.6 mm (5.34 in) was observed at Ganga Talao. While passing near Réunion, the cyclone produced torrential rain over the northern areas of the island. Total accumulations peaked at 796 mm (31.3 in) in Salazie. Although heavy, the rains were noted as normal for a tropical cyclone. Wind gusts were not as strong as initially forecast and did not exceed 100 km/h (62 mph); a peak gust of 91 km/h (57 mph) was measured in Bellevue Bras Panon. Agricultural damage in the region amounted to €6 million (US$6.4 million).

=== Tropical Cyclone Joalane ===
- Tropical cyclone (MFR)
- Category 2 tropical cyclone (SSHWS)
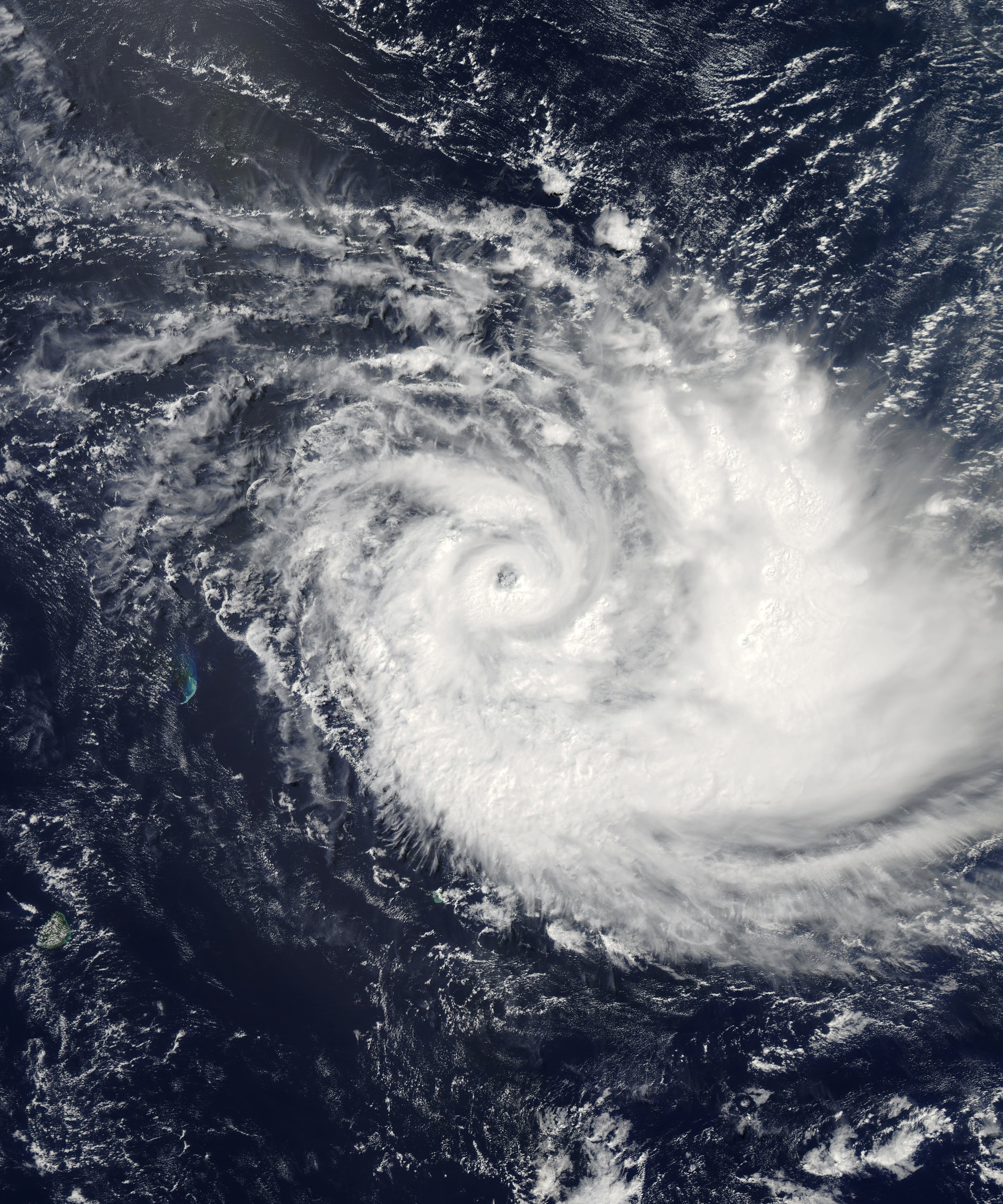
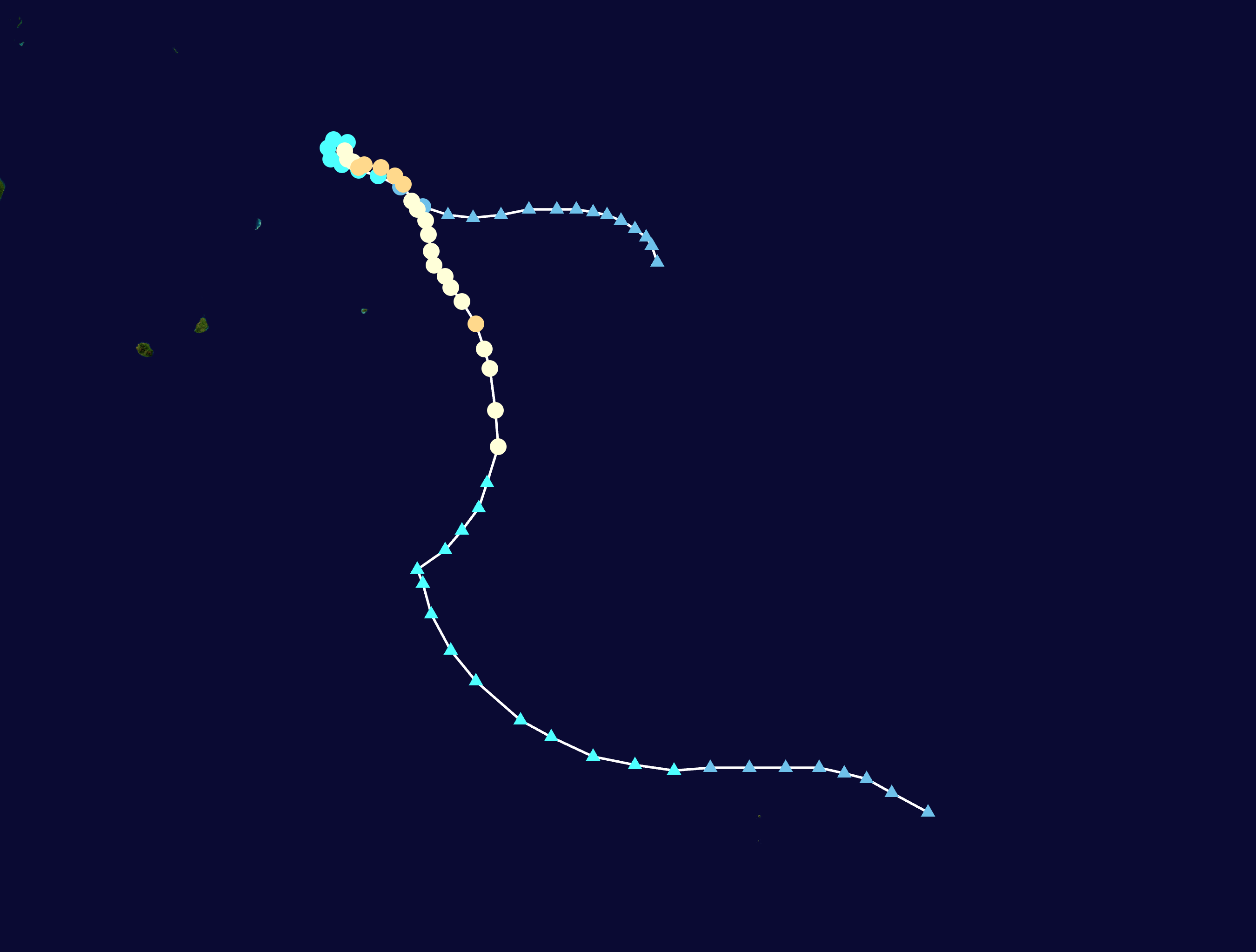
- Duration: April 2 – April 11
- Peak intensity: 140 km/h (85 mph) (10-min); 962 hPa (mbar)

On April 1, the MFR began to monitor Tropical Disturbance 13 several miles southeast of Diego Garcia. Post-storm analysis determined that it did not develop until April 2. Joalane rapidly intensified into a Tropical Cyclone strength system and reached peak intensity. Afterwards, Joalane kept strength while accelerating southward. Joalane became a remnant low late on April 11. The remnant low continued south until it degenerated to a trough by strong wind shear.

=== Severe Tropical Storm Ikola ===
- Severe tropical storm (MFR)
- Category 1 tropical cyclone (SSHWS)
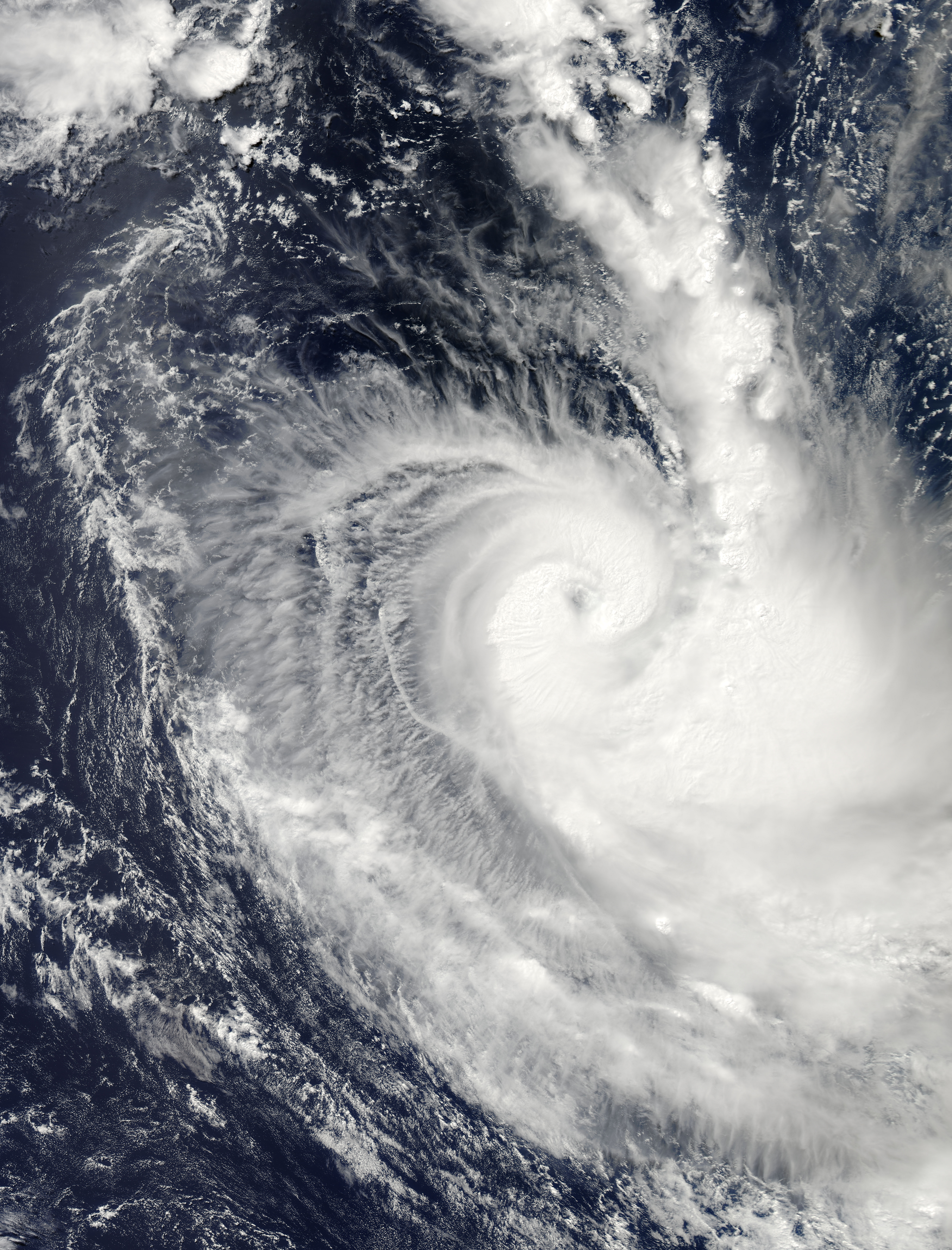
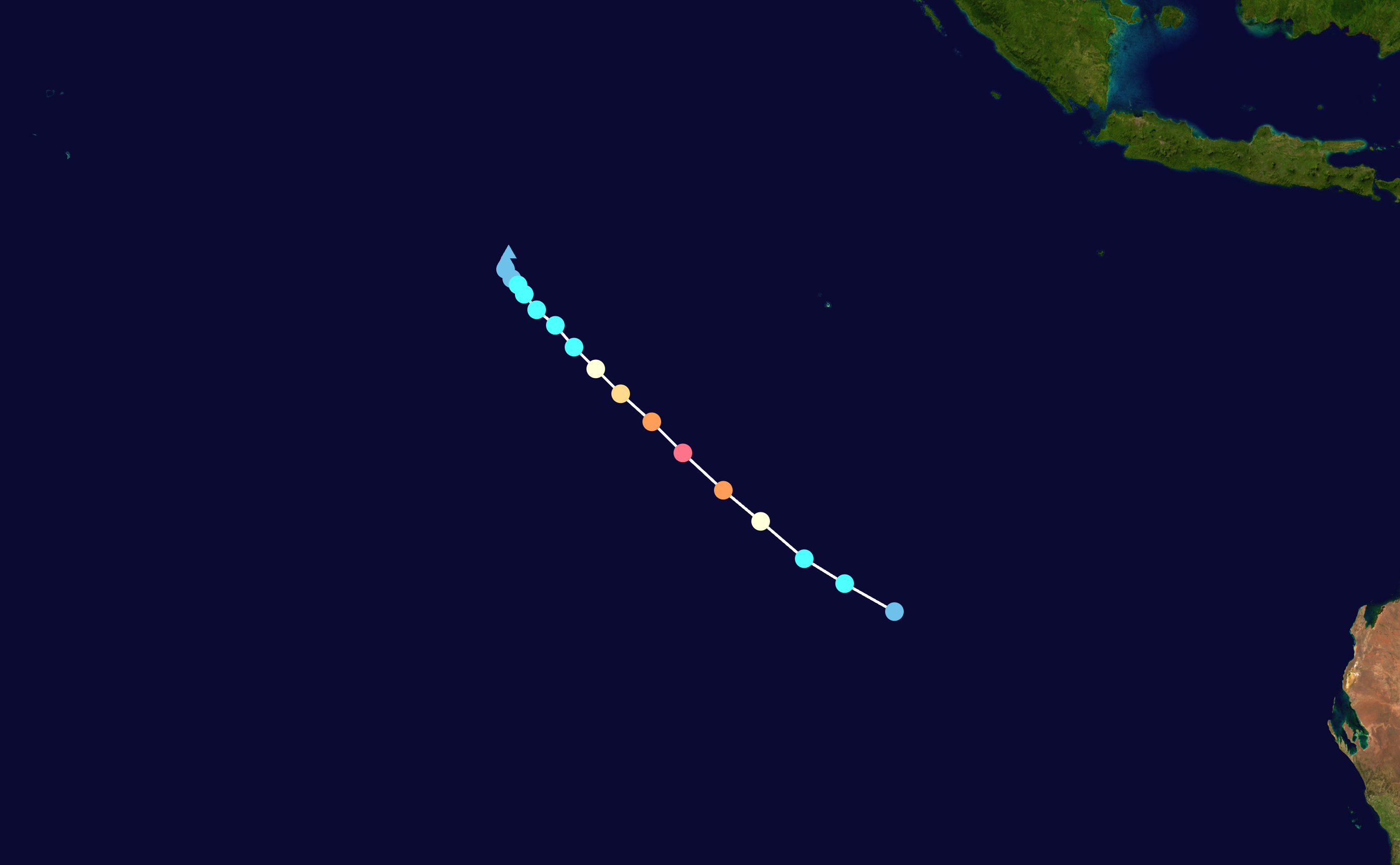
- Duration: April 5 – April 6 (Exited basin)
- Peak intensity: 105 km/h (65 mph) (10-min); 982 hPa (mbar)

On April 5, Tropical Depression 14 developed just west of the border of the Australian region basin. Later that day, the JTWC designated it as 21S. Due to a favorable environment, the system strengthened quickly, with MFR upgrading it to a tropical cyclone and was named Ikola as it crossed into the Australian region the next day.

=== Other systems ===
Early on December 13, Tropical Cyclone Bakung was a category 1 tropical cyclone on the Australian tropical cyclone intensity scale before entering this basin. However, during that day the system's low-level circulation centre became exposed and displaced about 280 km (175 mi) from the deep convection. As a result, TCWC Jakarta and the JTWC issued their final warnings on the system, while RSMC La Réunion declared it to be a remnant low in their first and only warning on the system.

== Storm names ==
Within the South-West Indian Ocean, tropical depressions and subtropical depressions that are judged to have 10-minute sustained windspeeds of 65 km/h, (40 mph) by the Regional Specialized Meteorological Center on La Réunion Island, France (RSMC La Réunion) are usually assigned a name. However, it is the Sub-Regional Tropical Cyclone Advisory Centers in Mauritius and Madagascar who name the systems. The Sub-Regional Tropical Cyclone Advisory Center in Mauritius names the storm should it intensify into a moderate tropical storm between 55°E and 90°E, if the storm should intensify into a moderate tropical storm between 30°E and 55°E then the Sub-Regional Tropical Cyclone Advisory Center in Madagascar assigns the appropriate name to the storm. New name lists are used every year, while a name is normally only used once so there are currently no names are retired.

Of note is the presence of the name Nathan in this list. This is unrelated to Cyclone Nathan which coincidentally formed during the same cyclone season in the neighbouring Australian region.

- Adjali
- Bansi
- Chedza
- Diamondra
- Eunice
- Fundi
- Glenda
- Haliba
- Ikola
- Joalane
- Kesha (unused)
- Lugenda (unused)
- Mahara (unused)
- Nathan (unused)
- Oscar (unused)
- Puleng (unused)
- Quenelle (unused)
- Rosaline (unused)
- Sitara (unused)
- Tarik (unused)
- Umali (unused)
- Vuntu (unused)
- Wezi (unused)
- Xolani (unused)
- Yolande (unused)
- Zita (unused)

== Seasonal effects ==
This table lists all of the tropical cyclones and subtropical cyclones that were monitored during the 2014–2015 South-West Indian Ocean cyclone season. Information on their intensity, duration, name, areas affected, primarily comes from RSMC La Réunion. Death and damage reports come from either press reports or the relevant national disaster management agency while the damage totals are given in 2014 or 2015 USD.

Name	Dates	Peak intensity			Areas affected	Damage (USD)	Deaths	Ref(s).
Name	Dates	Category	Wind speed	Pressure	Areas affected	Damage (USD)	Deaths	Ref(s).
Adjali	November 15–21	Severe tropical storm	100 km/h (65 mph)	987 hPa (29.15 inHg)	None	None	None	
02	November 24–30	Tropical depression	55 km/h (35 mph)	997 hPa (29.44 inHg)	Diego Garcia, Mauritius, Rodrigues	None	None	
Bakung	December 13	Remnant low	35 km/h (20 mph)	1,004 hPa (29.65 inHg)	None	None	None	
Kate	December 30–31	Intense tropical cyclone	165 km/h (105 mph)	950 hPa (28.05 inHg)	None	None	None	
Bansi	January 10–18	Very intense tropical cyclone	220 km/h (135 mph)	910 hPa (26.87 inHg)	Mascarene Islands	Minimal	None	
Chedza	January 14–19	Severe tropical storm	105 km/h (65 mph)	975 hPa (28.79 inHg)	Zimbabwe, Malawi, Mozambique, Madagascar, Réunion	$40 million	80	
Diamondra	January 26 – 30, 2015	Moderate tropical storm	85 km/h (50 mph)	986 hPa (29.12 inHg)	None	None	None	
Eunice	January 26 – February 1	Very intense tropical cyclone	230 km/h (145 mph)	915 hPa (27.02 inHg)	None	None	None	
Fundi	February 5–8	Severe tropical storm	100 km/h (60 mph)	978 hPa (28.88 inHg)	Madagascar	Unknown	5	
Glenda	February 22–28	Severe tropical storm	95 km/h (60 mph)	974 hPa (28.76 inHg)	None	None	None	
11	March 4–7	Tropical depression	55 km/h (35 mph)	998 hPa (29.47 inHg)	Mozambique, Madagascar	None	None	
Haliba	March 4 – 11, 2015	Moderate tropical storm	85 km/h (50 mph)	993 hPa (29.32 inHg)	Madagascar, Réunion, Mauritius	$6.4 million	26	
Joalane	April 2–11	Tropical cyclone	140 km/h (85 mph)	962 hPa (28.41 inHg)	None	None	None	
Ikola	April 5–6	Severe tropical storm	105 km/h (65 mph)	982 hPa (29.00 inHg)	None	None	None	
Season aggregates
14 systems	November 16 – April 11		230 km/h (145 mph)	910 hPa (26.87 inHg)		$46.4 million	111	

== See also ==
- Tropical cyclones in 2014 and 2015
- List of Southern Hemisphere tropical cyclone seasons
- Atlantic hurricane seasons: 2014, 2015
- Pacific hurricane seasons: 2014, 2015
- Pacific typhoon seasons: 2014, 2015
- North Indian Ocean cyclone seasons: 2014, 2015
- 2014–15 Australian region cyclone season
- 2014–15 South Pacific cyclone season
- South Atlantic tropical cyclone
