= Cyclone Nathan (2015) =

Category 3 Australian region Tropical cyclone in 2015

Severe Tropical Cyclone Nathan
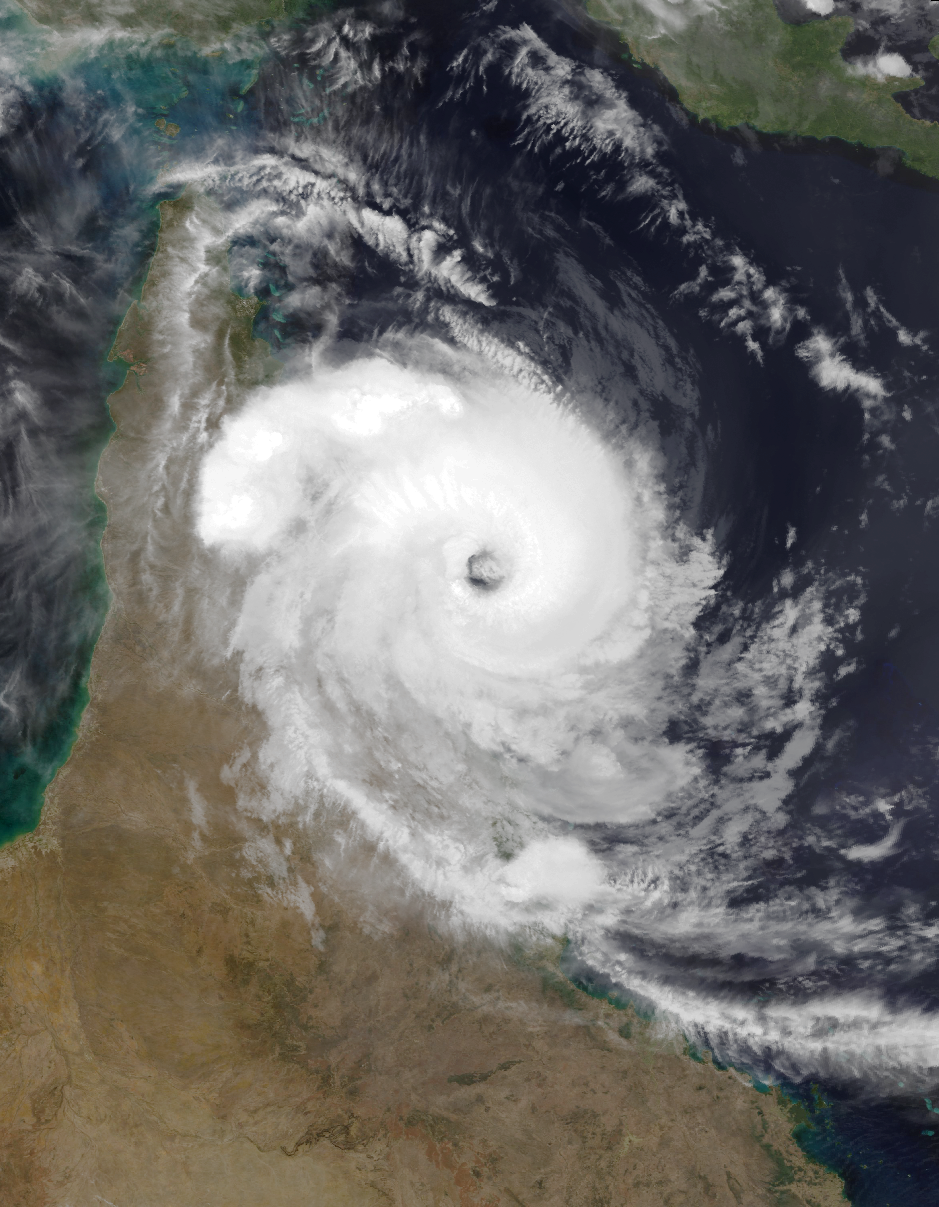
- Nathan nearing its first landfall on Queensland on March 19, 2015.

Meteorological history
- Formed: 9 March 2015
- Dissipated: 25 March 2015

Category 3 severe tropical cyclone
- 10-minute sustained (BOM)
- Highest winds: 150 km/h (90 mph)
- Lowest pressure: 969 hPa (mbar); 28.61 inHg

Category 3-equivalent tropical cyclone
- 1-minute sustained (SSHWS/JTWC)
- Highest winds: 185 km/h (115 mph)
- Lowest pressure: 969 hPa (mbar); 28.61 inHg

Overall effects
- Fatalities: None
- Damage: A$74.8 million
- Areas affected: Queensland, Northern Territory, Western Australia.
- Part of the 2014–15 Australian region cyclone season

Cyclone Nathan was a powerful tropical cyclone that had an erratic track across Australia. The cyclone formed from a tropical low near the Queensland coast that itself formed as a result of Cyclone Pam's outer rainbands. Later that day, the BoM designated the system as 17U and intensified into Tropical Cyclone Nathan several hours later. It slowly executed a cyclonic loop over the next few days, moving across Arnhem Land.

After intensifying to an initial peak intensity of 165 km/h (105 mph), Nathan weakened while crossing the Cape York Peninsula and reintensified over the Gulf of Carpentaria. It impacted Arnhem Land as an equivalent of a Category 1 cyclone, before hitting Darwin, Northern Territory, Northern Territory the same day. It dissipated afterwards. The remnants of Nathan brought 106 mm (4.2 in) of rainfall to Onslow, Western Australia on 30 March. Cyclone Nathan hit the Arnhem Land one month after Cyclone Lam.

Cyclone Nathan caused heavy flooding in Queensland and in the Northern Territory, though no deaths were reported. The cyclone's erratic path was a shock to many local residents. Total damage in northern Queensland were about A$74.8 million (US$57 million).

== Meteorological history ==
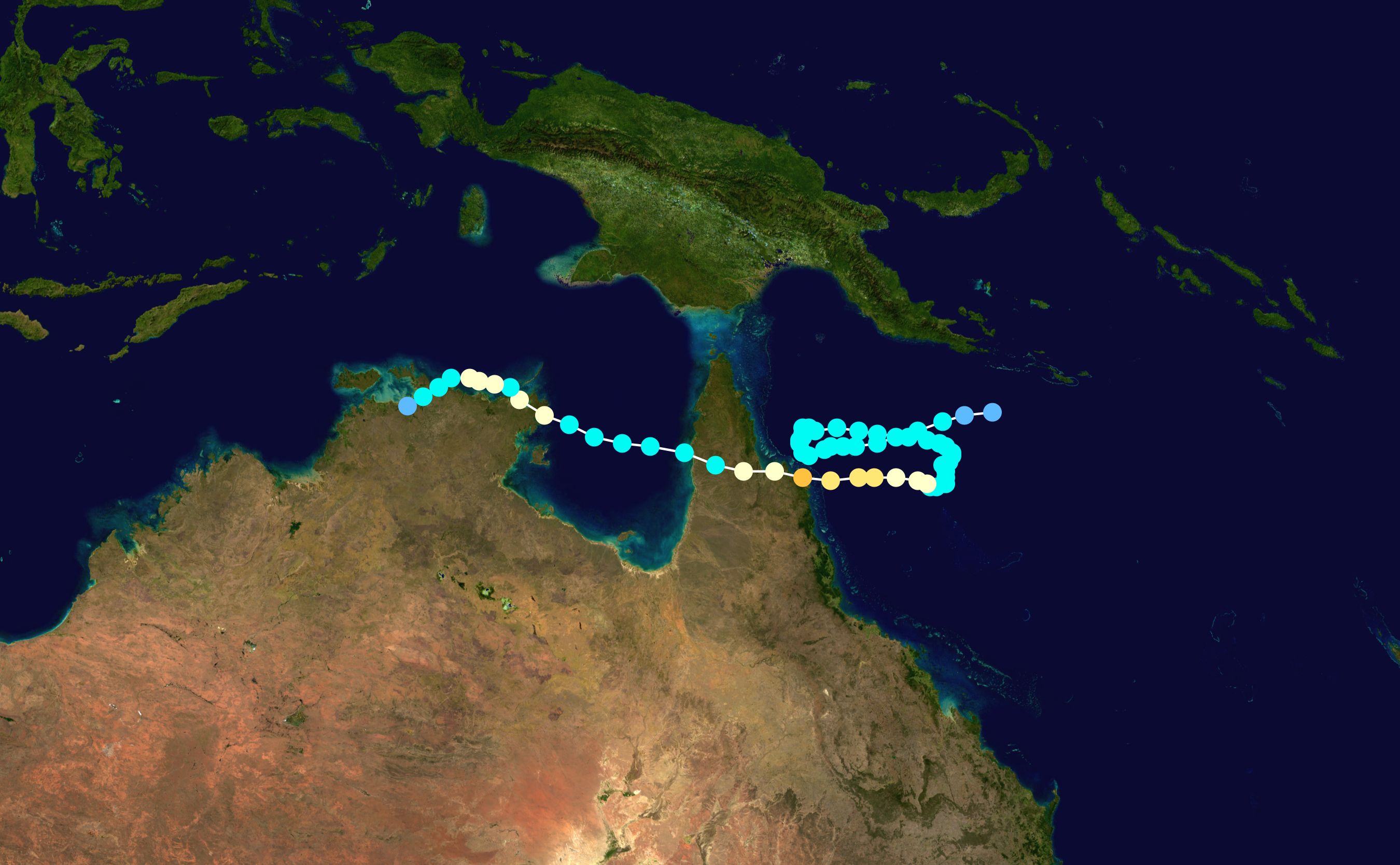
Map plotting the storm's track and intensity, according to the Saffir–Simpson scale Map key Saffir–Simpson scale Tropical depression (≤38 mph, ≤62 km/h) Tropical storm (39–73 mph, 63–118 km/h) Category 1 (74–95 mph, 119–153 km/h) Category 2 (96–110 mph, 154–177 km/h) Category 3 (111–129 mph, 178–208 km/h) Category 4 (130–156 mph, 209–251 km/h) Category 5 (≥157 mph, ≥252 km/h) Unknown Storm type Tropical cyclone Subtropical cyclone Extratropical cyclone, remnant low, tropical disturbance, or monsoon depression

On March 9, 2015, the outer rainbands of Cyclone Pam, which had recently made landfall in Vanuatu, generated a low-pressure area around 100 miles from the closest coastline of Queensland, Australia. The low-pressure area entered an area of warm waters and low wind shear, allowing the gradual increase in convection for the developing storm. As a result, the low-pressure area gradually intensified into a tropical storm, and the Bureau of Meteorology (BoM) named it "Nathan.

Nathan rapidly intensified to a category-2 cyclone within the same day, with maximum sustained winds of 110 mph. However, the period of intensification stopped as the cyclone experienced above-average wind shear and slightly colder waters. Despite this, Nathan still retained its category-2 intensity for nearly three more days as it took a winding path that curved two times. By the time the process finished, the cyclone was headed directly for the Cape York Peninsula.

During the curves, the cyclone periodically weakened below category-2 intensity into tropical storm intensity. However, it would always re-intensify back to category-2 strength. Near the end of its winding path, Nathan intensified into a final category-3 status, with maximum sustained winds of 125 mph. It made landfall in a sparsely populated area north of Cooktown on March 20 as a major cyclone with winds exceeding 185 km/h (115 mph), and gusts reaching nearly 210 km/h (130 mph).

As it passed over Cape York Peninsula, Nathan briefly weakened to tropical depression status. However, as a result of the brown ocean effect, it regained tropical storm status while being inland, and continued moving westwards. By March 22, as a result of the warm waters of the Gulf of Carpentaria, Nathan re-intensified into a hurricane and made landfall north of the small, remote Australian town of Nhulunbuy within the Northern Territory as a minimal hurricane. As it traveled over land, it quickly lost convection, and turned into a remnant low. The remnant low of Nathan traveled several more hundreds of miles, before eventually dissipating over the Timor Sea, west of Darwin, Northern Territory.

== Preparations ==
Being the first tropical cyclone to make landfall in Queensland on the year of 2015, Cyclone Nathan caused the residents of Cooktown and Hope Vale to seek shelter in bunkers due to warnings that Nathan could bring winds stronger than Cyclone Ita, which had made landfall in Queensland in 2014 and caused widespread damage. Warnings were activated from Coen to Cairns, extending to several inland areas that include Laura and Palmerville. The Queensland Fire and Emergency Services (QFES) deployed at least 51 Urban Search and Rescue technicians from several stations within Queensland to Cape York Peninsula due to the possibility of stranded people needing rescues in the aftermath of the cyclone.

Acting Chief Superintendent Brett Schafferius said, "Clearly all the key government agencies will be looking at what staff they have on the ground here and available and if need be, additional resources will be brought in. I can assure people up here that as every year we get an impact of cyclone in some measure, we're well and truly prepared for whatever Nathan will bring us". Heavy rain, flash floods, and high tide warnings were in place for nearly the entire region of Cape York Peninsula and for East Arnhem.

== Impact and aftermath ==
The cyclone and its remnant tropical depression brought heavy rainfall and flash-flooding to many parts of Queensland and the Northern Territory. The highest 24-hour rainfall totals included:

- 208 mm at Alcan Mine
- 261 mm at Fanny Creek
- 215 mm at Dorisvale
- 208 mm at Snowdrop Creek

Flash floods caused severe damage in inland Arnhem Land, including the destruction of several homes and businesses. In Nhulunbuy, flooding reached knee-deep and disrupted transportation and communication. Cyclone Nathan caused powerful wind-gusts throughout much of Lizard Island, causing heavy damage to the poor infrastructure of the rural island. Roof shingles were blown away, trees were uprooted, and power poles snapped near the landfall site in Yirrkala.

Road closures and flight and ferry cancellations were widespread, causing severe transportation disruption. As runways and roads were washed out, emergency aid was blocked from entering the affected region in any proper manner. Flooding in Darwin, Northern Territory forced aid-carrying flights to instead land way west in Port Hedland, delaying aid by nearly an entire day, as washed roads caused helicopters to take the role as trucks would have. Total damage in northern Queensland were about A$74.8 million (US$57 million).

== See also ==
- Tropical cyclones in 2015
- Cyclone Lam – A powerful Tropical cyclone that had a affected Arnhem Land less than a month prior.
- Cyclone Larry - The last powerful tropical cyclone to make landfall in Cape York Peninsula.
- 2014–15 Australian region cyclone season
