= 2014–15 Australian region cyclone season =

Tropical cyclone season

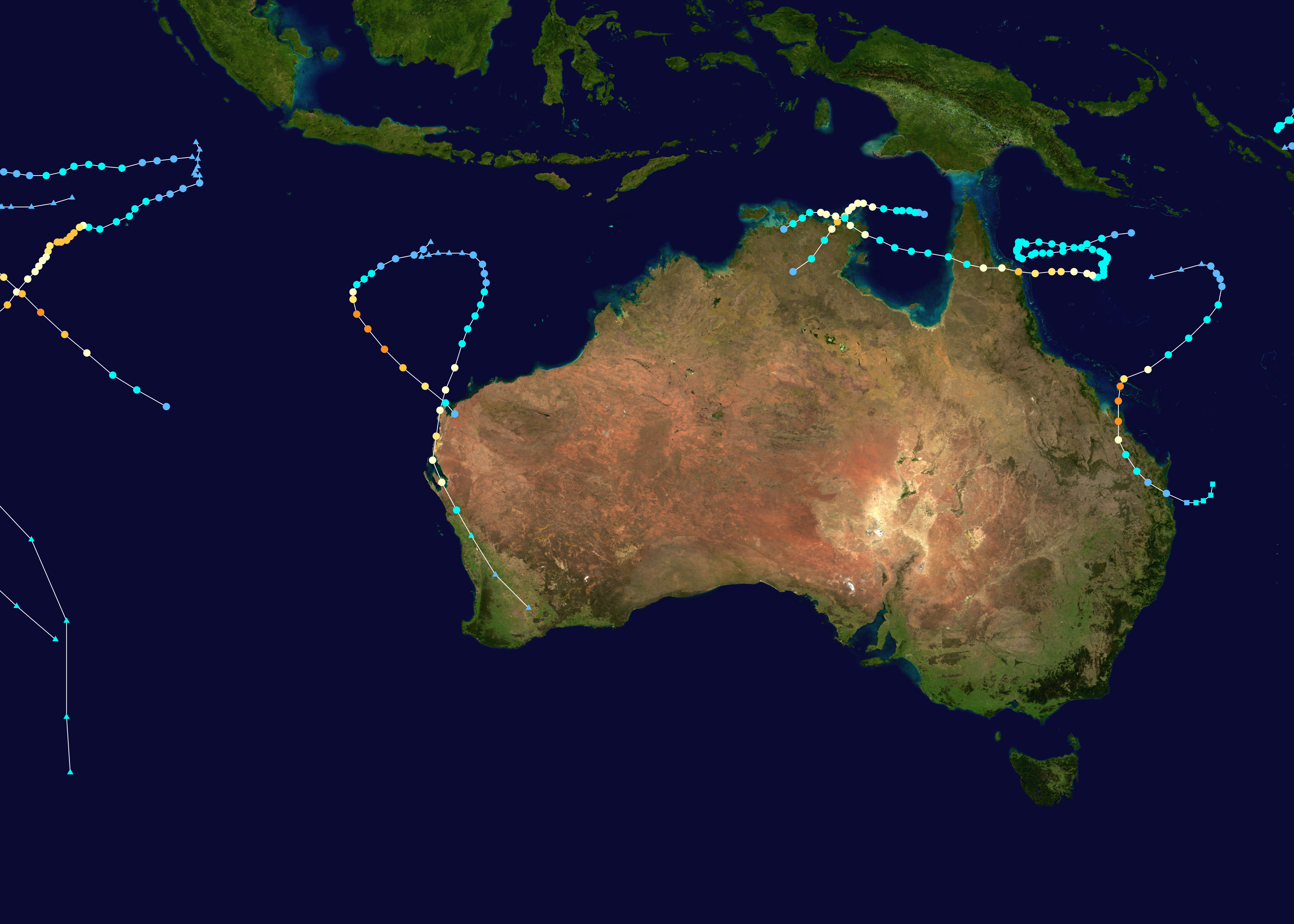
- Season summary map

Seasonal boundaries
- First system formed: 3 December 2014
- Last system dissipated: 5 July 2015 (record latest)

Strongest storm
- Name: Marcia
  - Maximum winds: 205 km/h (125 mph) (10-minute sustained)
  - Lowest pressure: 930 hPa (mbar)

Seasonal statistics
- Tropical lows: 17
- Tropical cyclones: 9
- Severe tropical cyclones: 7
- Total fatalities: 2 total
- Total damage: $798.4 million (2015 USD)

Related articles
- 2014–15 South-West Indian Ocean cyclone season; 2014–15 South Pacific cyclone season

The 2014–15 Australian region cyclone season was a slightly below average tropical cyclone season, though it featured numerous intense cyclones. The season officially ran from 1 November 2014, to 30 April 2015, however, a tropical cyclone formed at any time between 1 July 2014, and 30 June 2015 would count towards the season total. During the season, tropical cyclones were officially monitored, by one of the five Tropical Cyclone Warning Centres (TCWCs) that are operated in this region.

Three of the five centres are operated by the Australian Bureau of Meteorology (BoM) in Perth, Darwin, and Brisbane, while the other two are operated by the National Weather Service of Papua New Guinea in Port Moresby and the Indonesian Agency for Meteorology, Climatology and Geophysics in Jakarta, Indonesia. The United States Joint Typhoon Warning Center (JTWC) and other national meteorological services, including Météo-France, also monitored the basin during the season.

== Seasonal forecasts ==
Region	Chance of more	Average number	Actual activity
Whole	34%	11	8
Western	43%	7	3
North-Western	38%	5	0
Northern	46%	3	2
Eastern	42%	4	3
Southern Pacific	48%	15	9
Western South Pacific	56%	8	7
Eastern South Pacific	47%	11	2
Source: BOM's Seasonal Outlooks for Tropical Cyclones.

Ahead of the cyclone season, the Australian Bureau of Meteorology (BoM), the New Zealand National Institute of Water and Atmospheric Research (NIWA) and various other Pacific Meteorological services, all contributed towards the Island Climate Update tropical cyclone outlook that was released during October 2014. The outlook took into account the ENSO neutral conditions that had been observed across the Pacific and analogue seasons that had ENSO neutral and weak El Niño conditions occurring during the season. The outlook called for a near average number of tropical cyclones for the 2014–15 season, with eight to twelve named tropical cyclones, to occur between 135°E and 120°W compared to an average of 10. At least four of the tropical cyclones were expected to become category 3 severe tropical cyclones, while three could become category 4 severe tropical cyclones, they also noted that a Category 5 severe tropical cyclone was unlikely to occur.

In addition to contributing towards the Island Climate Update outlook, the BoM issued eight seasonal forecasts during October 2014, for the Australian region and the Southern Pacific with each forecast covering the whole tropical cyclone year. Each forecast issued took into account the near El Niño conditions that had developed over the region and the El Niño episode that was expected to develop during the season. For the basin as a whole, they predicted that there was a 34% chance, that the season would be near its average of around 11 tropical cyclones. For the Western region between 90°E and 125°E, the BoM forecast that the area would see activity near to the average of 7, with a 43% chance of an above-average cyclone season. TCWC Perth also noted that there was a likelihood of two tropical cyclones and a significant likelihood of at least one severe tropical cyclone impacting Western Australia.

For the North-Western subregion between 105°E and 130°E, it was predicted that activity would be below average, with a 38% chance of above average tropical cyclone activity. The Northern Territory which was defined as being between as being 125°E and 142.5°E had a 46% chance of an above average season, with TCWC Darwin noting that all of the climate drivers were pointing towards a typical tropical cyclone season for Northern Australia. The Eastern region between 142.5°E and 160°E was predicted to have a near normal tropical cyclone season, though it was noted that there was a possibility of a delayed start to the season. The BoM also issued 3 seasonal forecasts for the Southern Pacific between 142.5°E and 120°W, one for the Western Southern Pacific region between 142.5°E and 165°E and one for the Eastern Southern Pacific region between 165°E and 120°W. They predicted that the region as a whole would experience near average tropical cyclone activity during the coming season with a 55% chance of it being above average. The Western region was predicted to have 39% chance of being above average while the Eastern region had a 55% chance of being above average.

An updated Island Climate Update tropical cyclone outlook was issued during February 2015, which suggested that near normal activity was still possible. The outlook took into account Tropical Cyclones Niko and Ola as well as the weak El Niño conditions, that were predicted to persist over the region. As a result, the update predicted that an additional six to eight named tropical cyclones would develop over the basin, which would bring the overall total to between eight and ten tropical cyclones. The update also predicted that at least four tropical cyclones would intensify into category three severe tropical cyclones, of which three could intensify and become either a category four or five severe tropical cyclones.

== Systems ==
=== Tropical Low 01U ===
- Tropical depression (SSHWS)
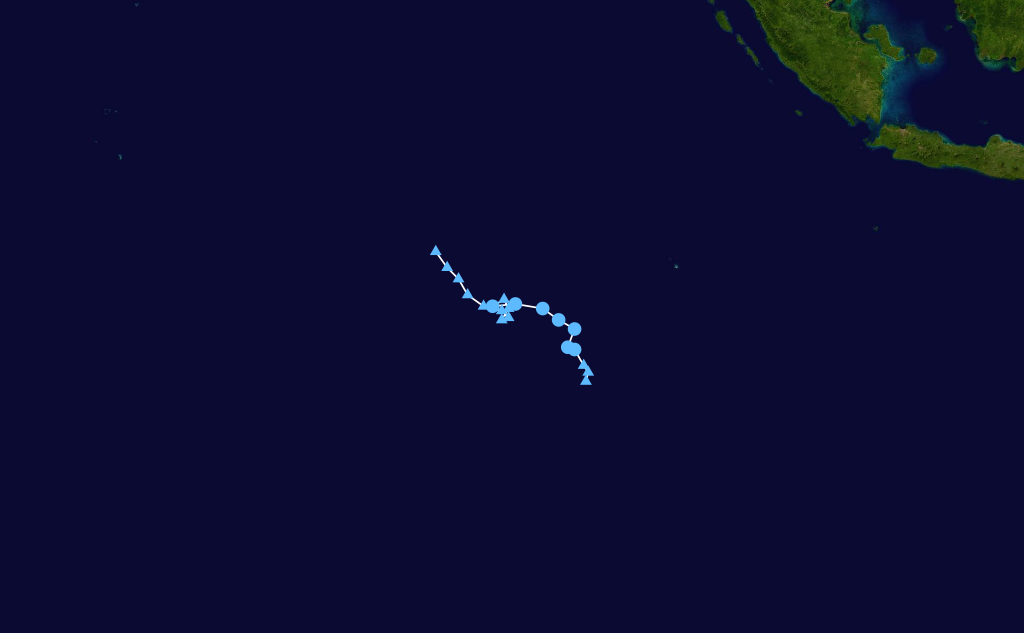
- Duration: 3 December – 4 December
- Peak intensity: 55 km/h (35 mph) (1-min); 1000 hPa (mbar)

On 3 December, TCWC Perth reported that Tropical Low 01U had developed over open water to the southwest of Cocos (Keeling) Islands, after various applications of the Dvorak technique had produced results between T2.0 and T3.0. They also reported that the low could develop into a tropical cyclone during the following six to twelve hours, however, TCWC Perth issued its final advisory on the system during the next day as the system was not likely to develop into a tropical cyclone and had started weakening.

=== Tropical Cyclone Bakung ===
- Category 2 tropical cyclone (Australian scale)
- Tropical storm (SSHWS)
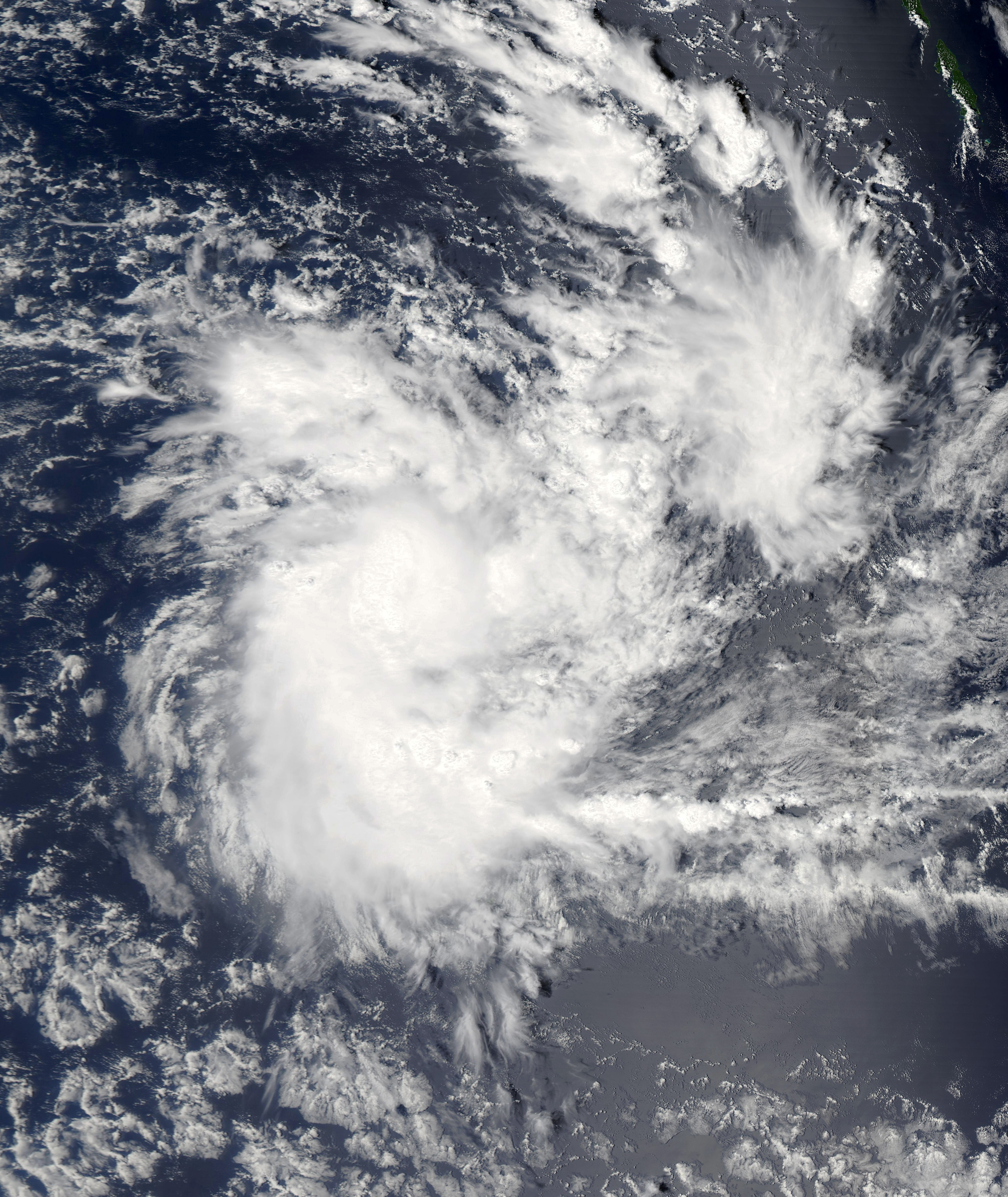
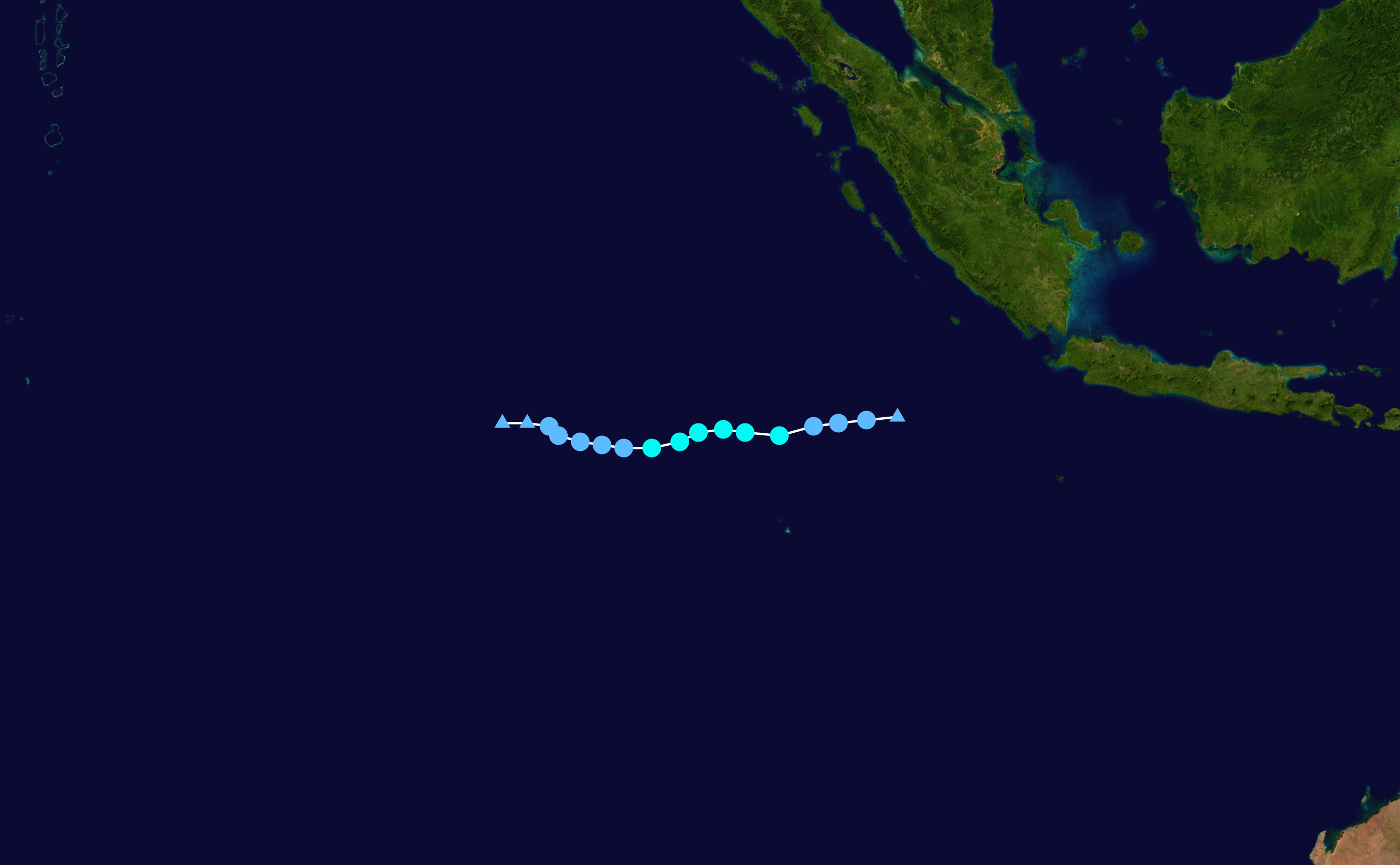
- Duration: 10 December – 13 December
- Peak intensity: 95 km/h (60 mph) (10-min); 991 hPa (mbar)

During 10 December, a tropical low developed about 535 km (330 mi) to the north-east of the Cocos (Keeling) Islands. The system had developed within a favourable environment for further development, with low to moderate vertical wind shear and a good poleward outflow which was being enhanced by a trough of low pressure. Over the next day, the system gradually intensified/developed further, with atmospheric convection deepening near the centre of the system. TCWC Jakarta subsequently named the low Bakung during 11 December, as it was thought that the system had become a Category 2 tropical cyclone on the Australian Scale. At the same time, TCWC Jakarta reported that Bakung had peaked with 10-minute sustained windspeeds of 65 km/h (40 mph) before the JTWC initiated advisories on the system later that day and designated it Tropical Cyclone 03S.

On 12 December, TCWC Jakarta reported that the system had weakened into a Category 1 tropical cyclone, while the JTWC reported that the system had intensified slightly and reached its peak intensity with 1-minute sustained windspeeds of 65 km/h (40 mph). Early the next day as Tropical Cyclone Bakung continued to move westwards, it moved out of the Australian region and into the South-West Indian Ocean. However, during that day the system's low-level circulation centre became exposed and displaced about 280 km (175 mi) from the deep convection. As a result, TCWC Jakarta and the JTWC issued their final warnings on the system, while RSMC La Réunion declared it to be a remnant low in their only warning on the system.

=== Severe Tropical Cyclone Kate ===
- Category 4 severe tropical cyclone (Australian scale)
- Category 3 tropical cyclone (SSHWS)
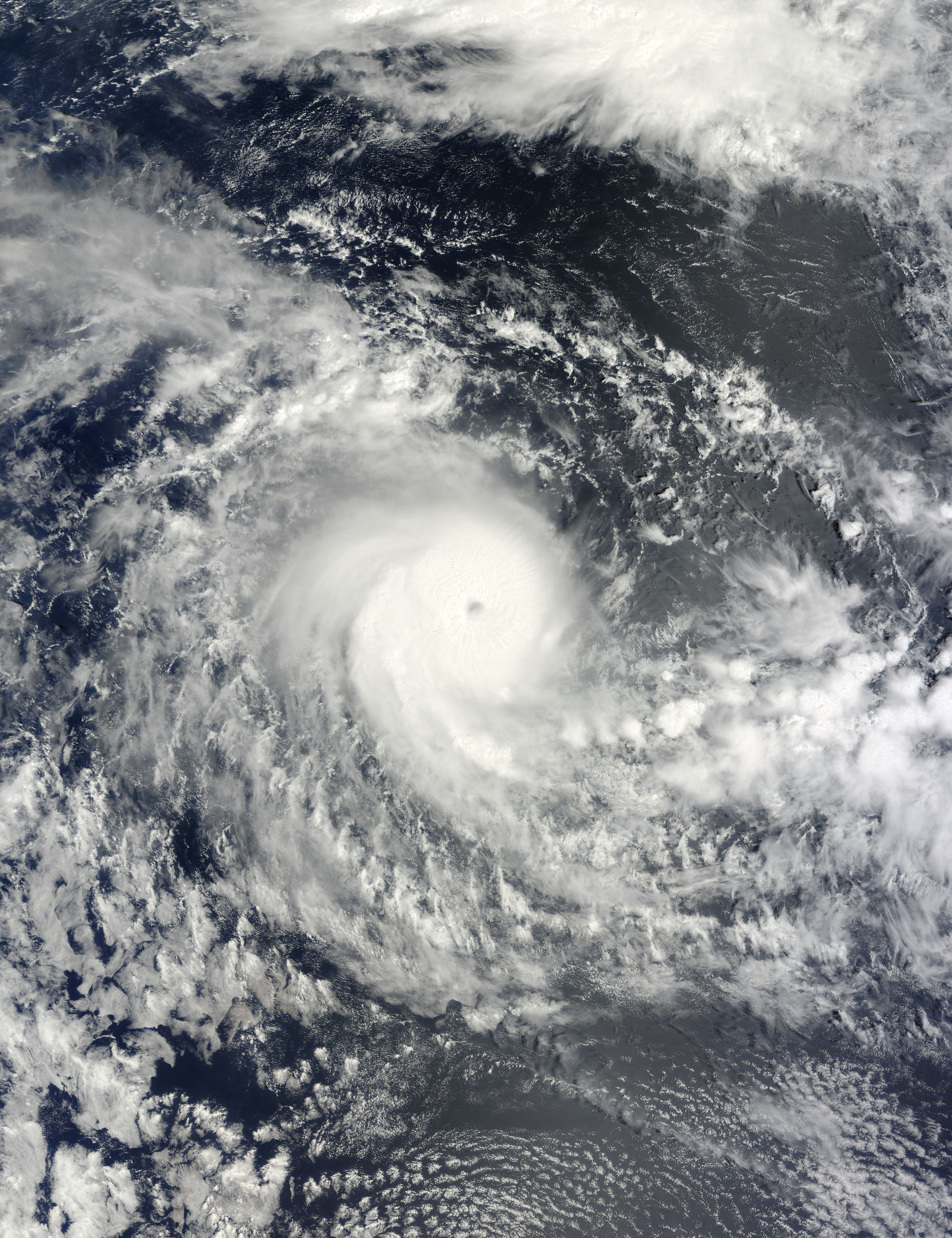
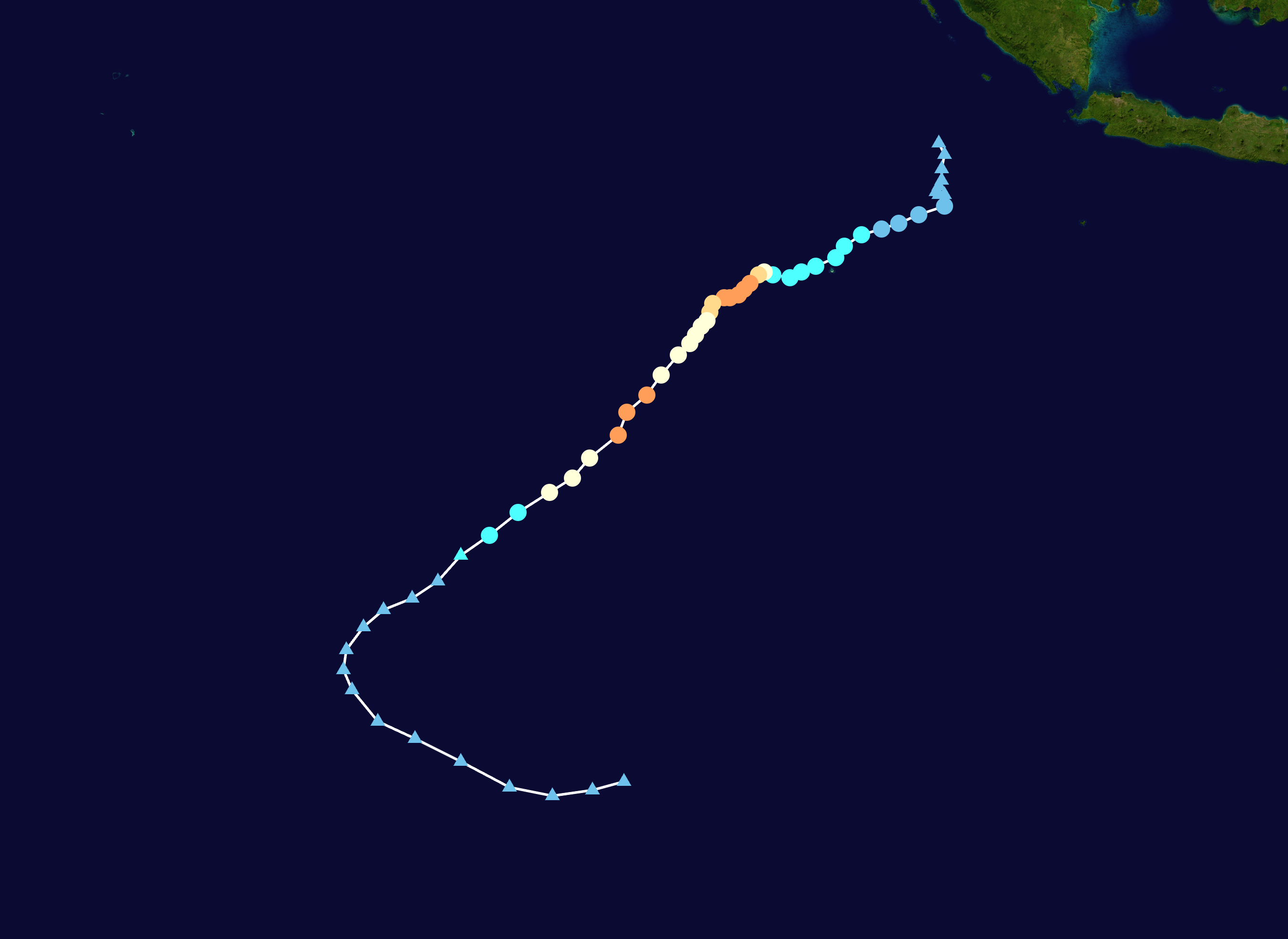
- Duration: 21 December – 30 December (Exited basin)
- Peak intensity: 160 km/h (100 mph) (10-min); 967 hPa (mbar)

On 21 December, TCWC Perth reported that Tropical Low 04U had developed within the monsoon trough to the southeast of Sumatra, Indonesia. Over the next few days, the system gradually developed further as it moved south-eastwards before it started to move towards the southwest, passing on the Cocos (Keeling) Islands during 23 December. Early the next day, it intensified into a Category 1 tropical cyclone, as BOM named the system Kate. The next day, Kate continued to intensify as an eye developed and reached peak intensity as a Category 4 severe tropical cyclone. On 27 December, it weakened as it underwent an eyewall replacement cycle. On 30 December, the BoM reported that Kate had moved out of the Australian region and into the South-West Indian Ocean basin with 10-minute sustained winds of 150 km/h (90 mph).

107.6mm of rain was recorded in a 24-hour period on the island. Flooding was reported from Home and West Islands. Some trees were damaged and there was some property damage.

=== Tropical Low 05U ===
- Tropical low (Australian scale)
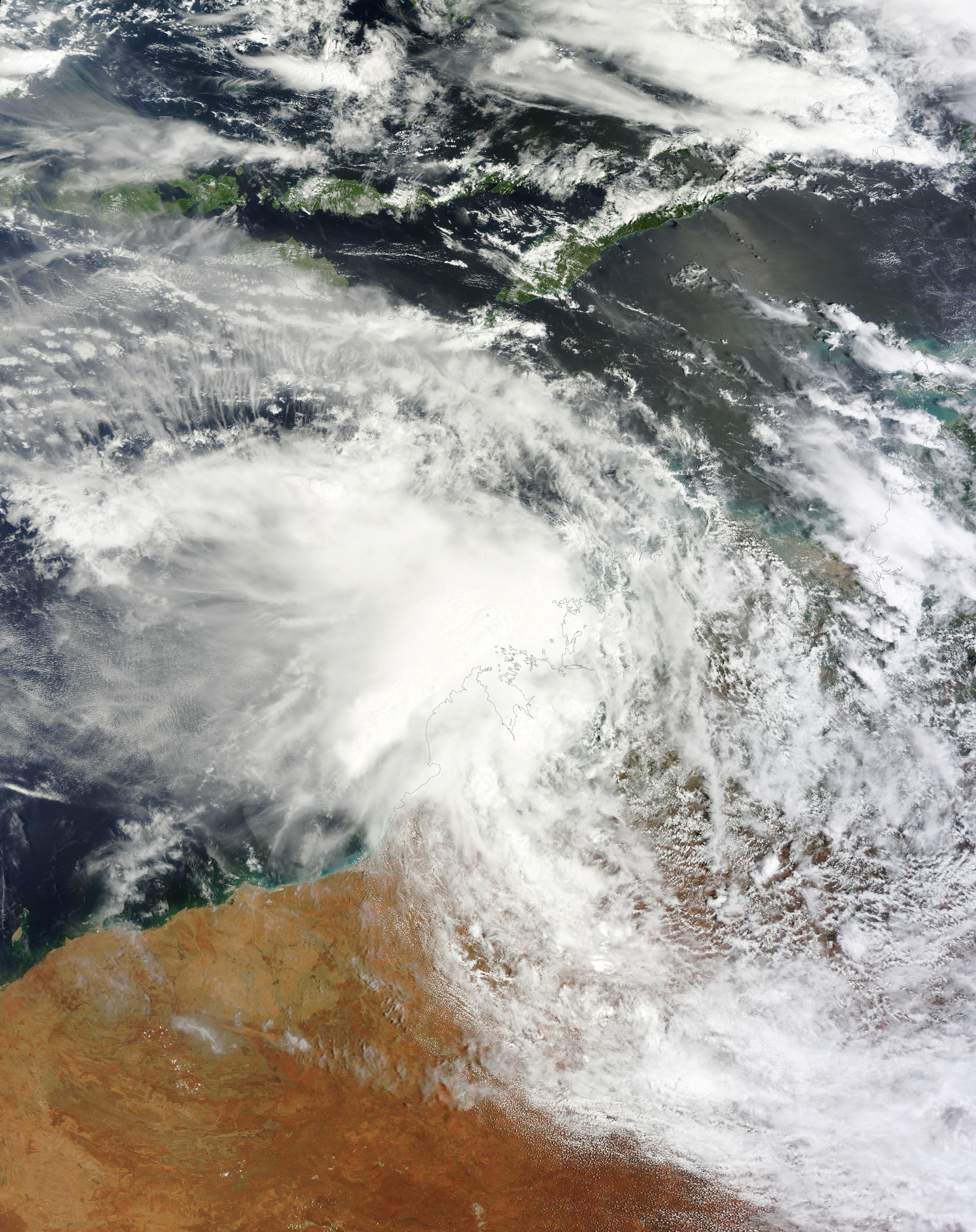
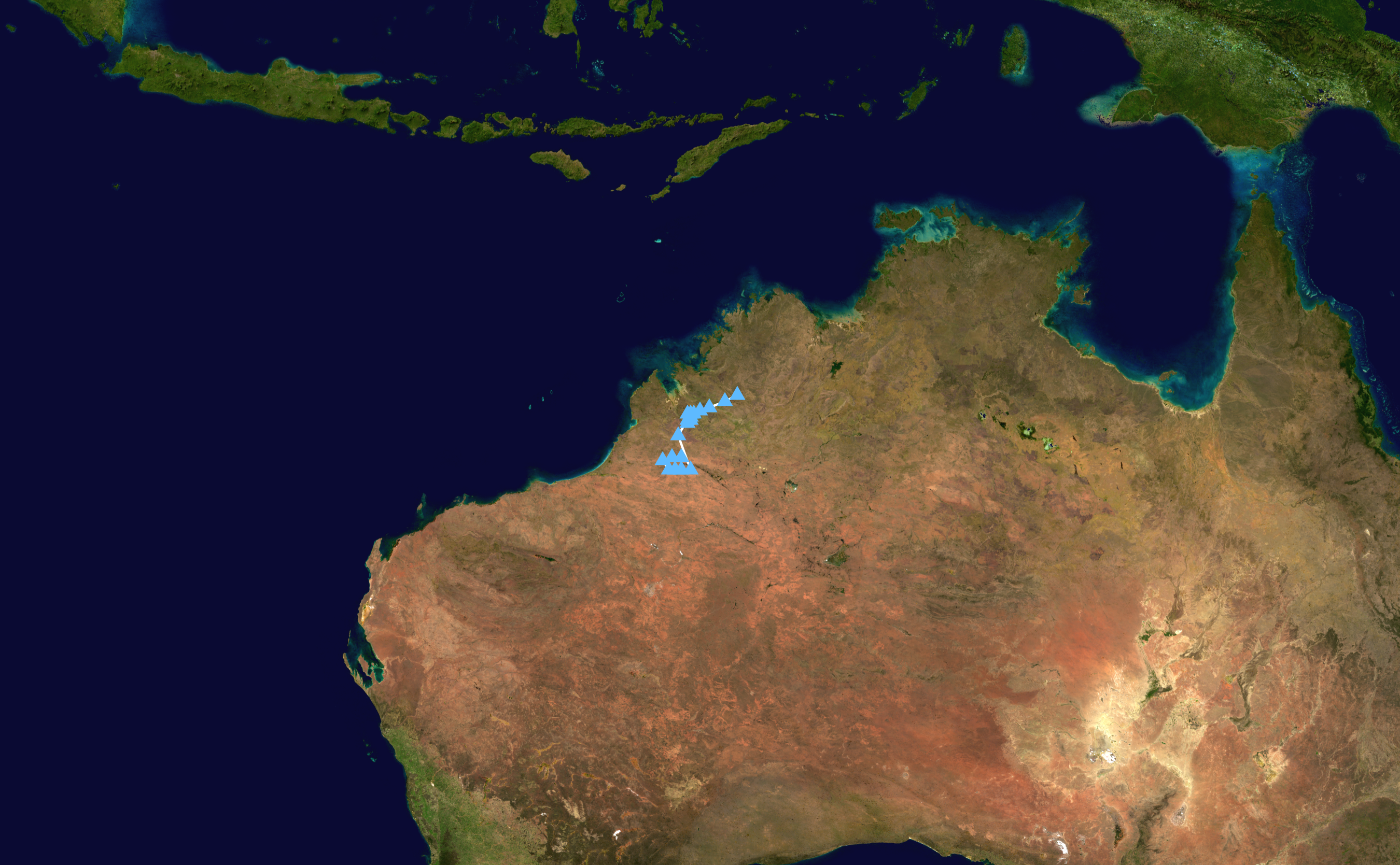
- Duration: 2 January – 10 January

On 2 January, TCWC Perth and Darwin started to monitor Tropical Low 05U, that had developed within the monsoon trough near Wyndham in the Kimberley region of Western Australia. Over the next few days, the low moved slowly towards the southwest and passed to the southeast of Derby during 6 and 7 January. On 8 January, the low began a southward track before tracking to the east on 9 January. During the same day, the low moved south of Fitzroy Crossing and south of Halls Creek later in the evening. The system crossed into the Northern Territory early on 10 January before dissipating later that day.

In total, over 1000mm of rain was recorded over inland communities due to 05U.

=== Tropical Low 06U ===
- Tropical low (Australian scale)
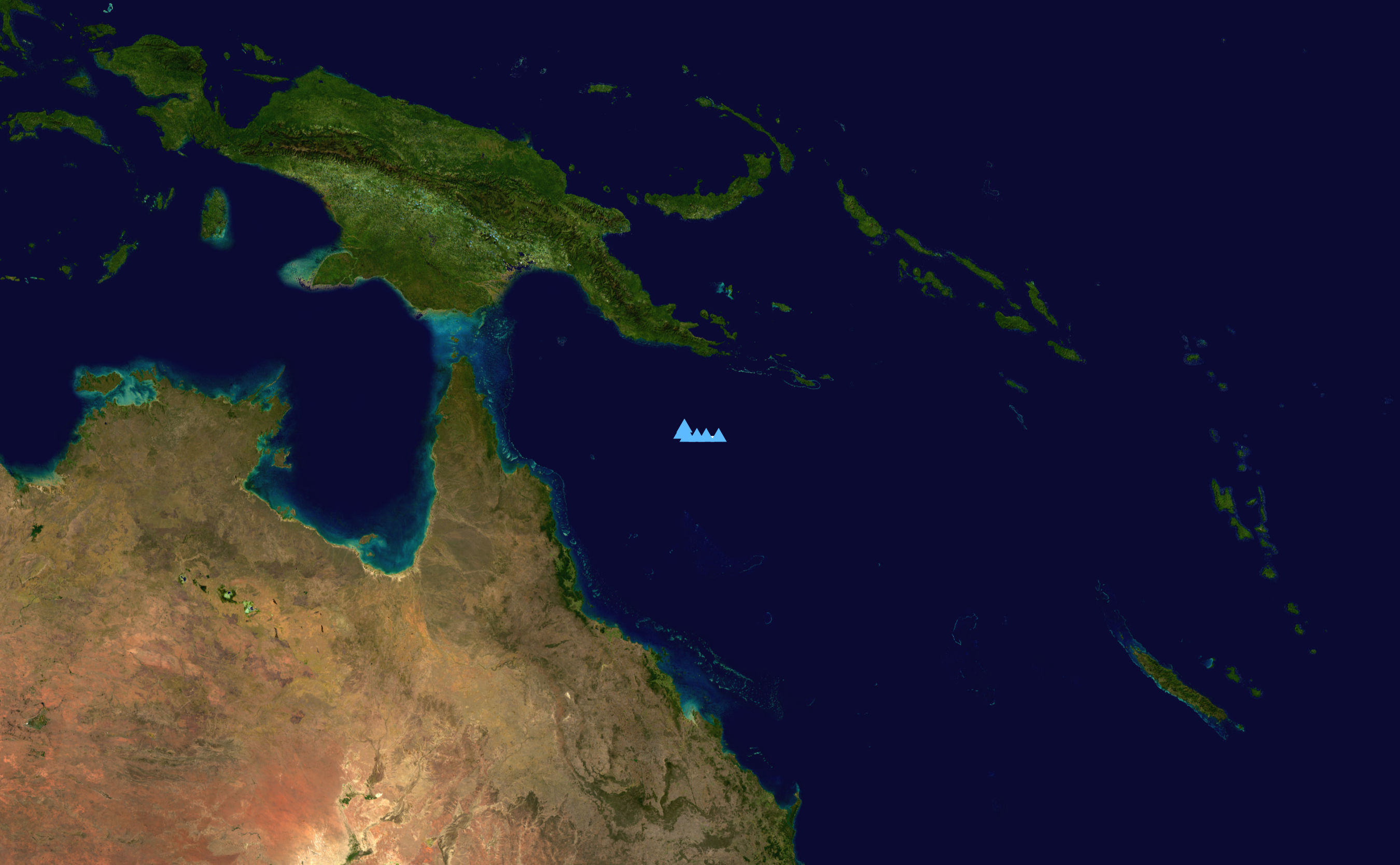
- Duration: 10 January – 13 January

On 10 January, TCWC Brisbane reported that Tropical Low 06U had developed within the monsoon trough, within an unfavorable environment for further development to the northeast of Queensland. Over the next couple of days, the system moved southeastwards and may have influenced the track of Tropical Low 07U, before it was last noted during 13 January.

=== Tropical Low 07U ===
- Tropical low (Australian scale)
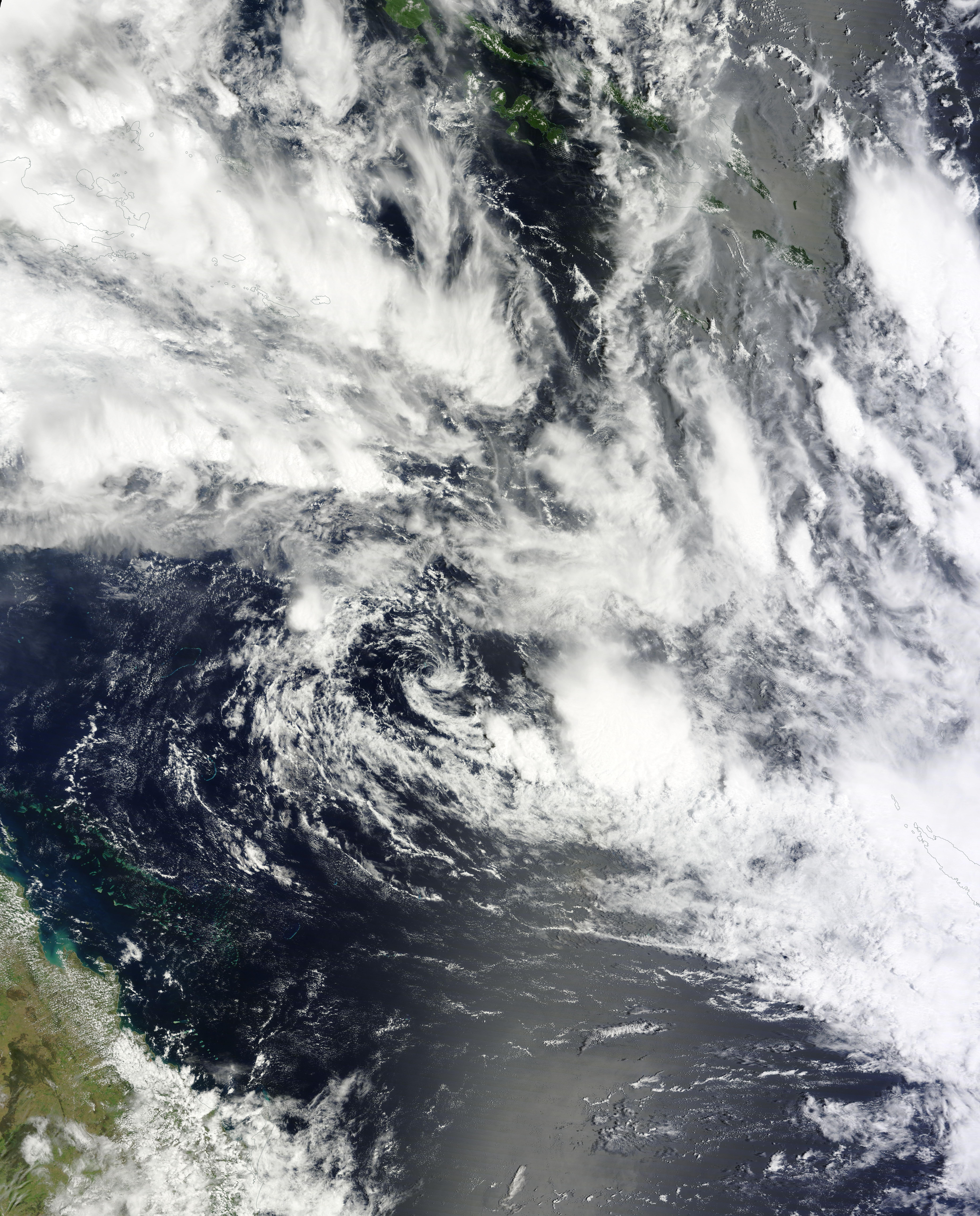
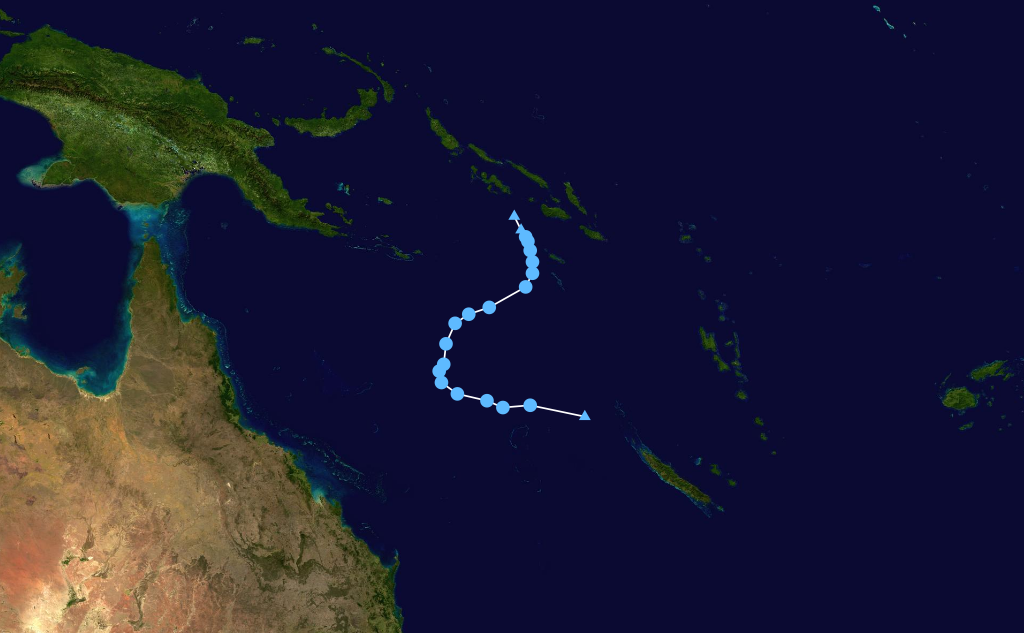
- Duration: 10 January – 13 January
- Peak intensity: 55 km/h (35 mph) (10-min); 998 hPa (mbar)

On 10 January, the BoM started to monitor a tropical low south of the Solomon Islands. It gradually moved on the south, passing just east of Australia, before it was last noted on the 13th of the same month as it dissipated to the northwest of New Caledonia.

It peaked at 55 km/h (35 mph) on its lifetime, with 998 hPa (mbar).

=== Tropical Low 08U ===
- Tropical low (Australian scale)
- Duration: 16 January – 20 January
- Peak intensity: 30 km/h (20 mph) (10-min); 1003 hPa (mbar)

During 17 January, a tropical low that had been monitored by the BoM for a few days, moved into the Northern Kimberley region from the Northern Territory. Over the next couple of days, the system moved south-westwards over land before it moved offshore and into the Indian Ocean near Broome during 19 January. As computer models were predicting conditions surrounding the low to be marginally favourable for further development, TCWC Perth expected the system to develop into a tropical cyclone and issued tropical cyclone advice for coastal areas from Kuri Bay to Exmouth. However, as the system spent more time over land than had been forecasted and vertical wind shear did not weaken as much as forecasted. As a result, the system failed to develop into a tropical cyclone as it moved south-westwards towards the Pilbara coast before it dissipated near Port Hedland during 20 January.

=== Tropical Low 09U ===
- Tropical low (Australian scale)
- Duration: 30 January – 30 January

=== Tropical Low 12U ===
- Tropical low (Australian scale)
- Duration: 13 February – 16 February

On 13 February, a tropical low developed roughly 700 km (430 mi) southwest of the Cocos (Keeling) Islands. The BoM stopped warning on it late on 16 February as it moved in a southerly direction.

=== Severe Tropical Cyclone Lam ===
- Category 4 severe tropical cyclone (Australian scale)
- Category 3 tropical cyclone (SSHWS)
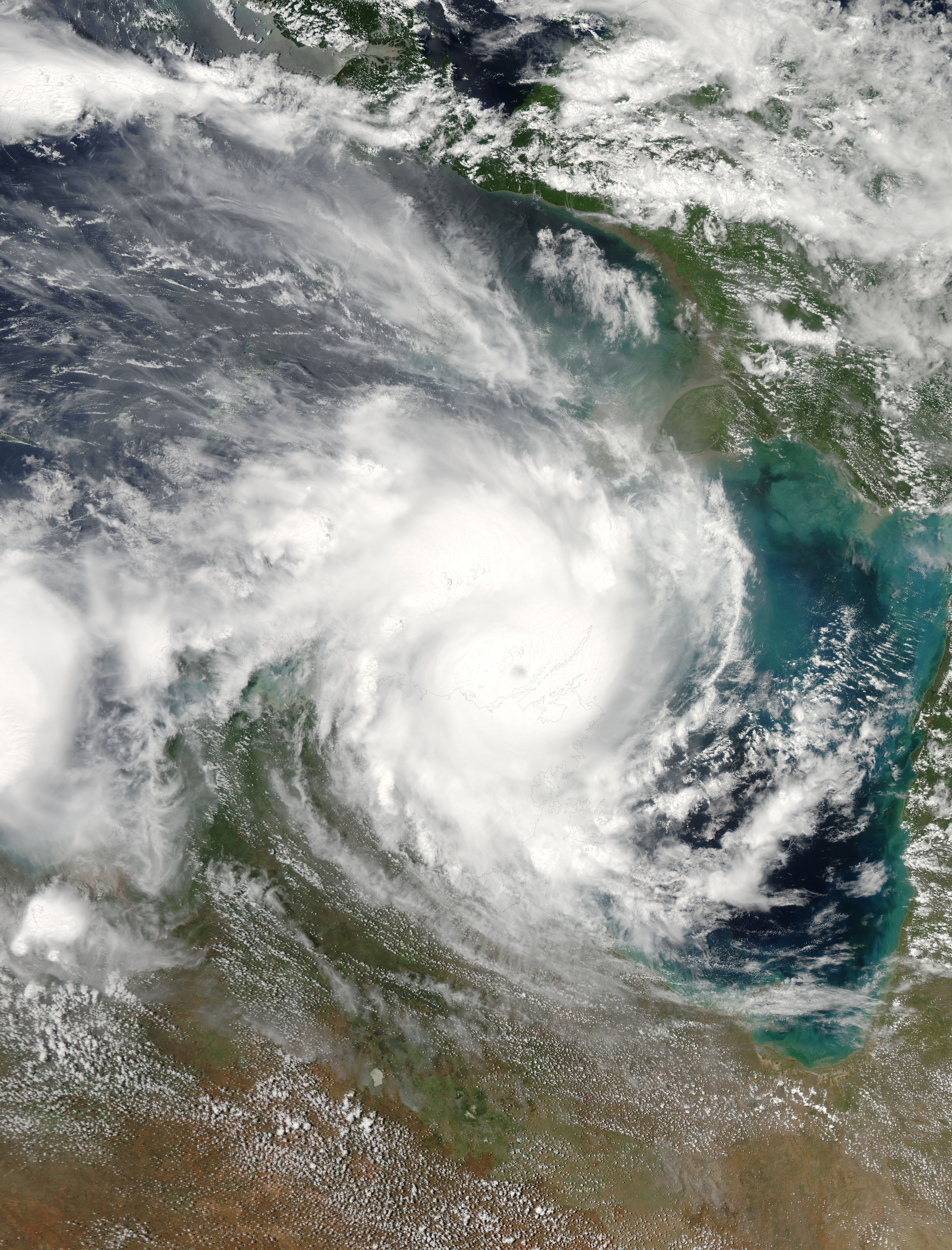
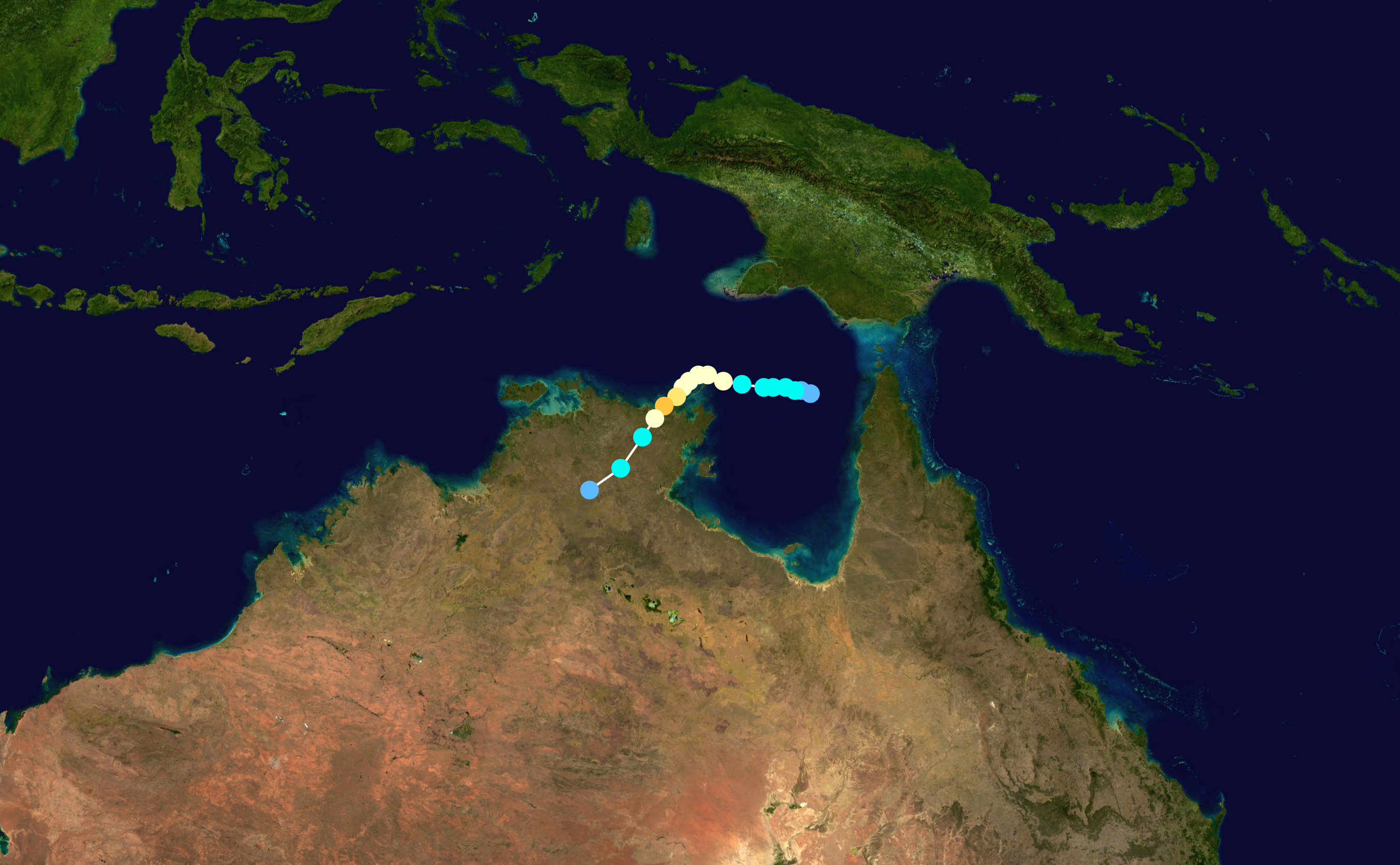
- Duration: 12 February – 20 February
- Peak intensity: 185 km/h (115 mph) (10-min); 942 hPa (mbar)

Cyclone Lam was the strongest storm to strike Australia's Northern Territory since Cyclone Monica in 2006. It formed from the monsoon trough on 12 February in the Coral Sea. For much of its duration, the system moved westward due to a ridge to the south. The system crossed over the Cape York Peninsula and moved into the Gulf of Carpentaria, whereupon it gradually organized due to warm waters and favorable outflow. On 16 February, the Bureau of Meteorology (BoM) classified it as a Category 1 on the Australian tropical cyclone intensity scale and gave it the name Lam. The storm intensified further while drifting toward the Wessel Islands, developing an eye and strengthening to the equivalence of a minimal hurricane on 18 February. It strengthened to reach maximum sustained winds of 185 km/h (115 mph) early on 19 February before turning to the southwest, making it a Category 4 cyclone. That day, it made landfall on Northern Territory between Milingimbi and Elcho Island at peak intensity, and it rapidly weakened over land. About six hours after Lam moved ashore, Cyclone Marcia struck Queensland as a Category 5 cyclone, marking the first time on record that two storms of Category 4 intensity struck Australia on the same day.

In its formative stages, Lam produced heavy rainfall and flooding in Far North Queensland. Later, the cyclone's rainfall set daily precipitation records in Northern Territory. However, the winds caused the most damage, with gusts estimated as high as 230 km/h (145 mph). The highest gust was 170 km/h (105 mph) at Cape Wessel on Rimbija Island. Lam caused considerable destruction, particularly affecting local aboriginal communities. Total damage in the Northern Territory reached at least A$82.4 million (US$64.3 million).

=== Severe Tropical Cyclone Marcia ===
- Category 5 severe tropical cyclone (Australian scale)
- Category 4 tropical cyclone (SSHWS)
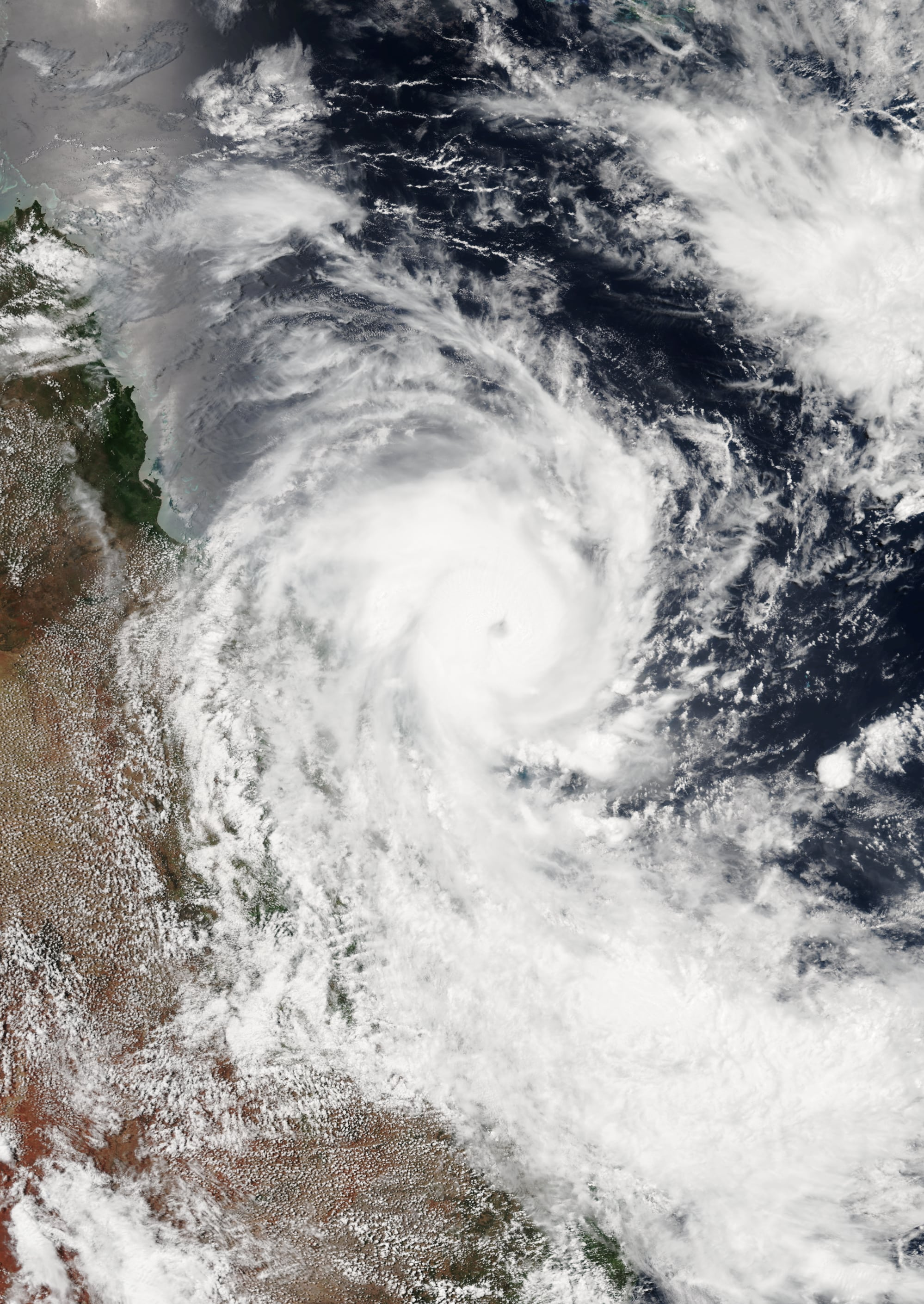
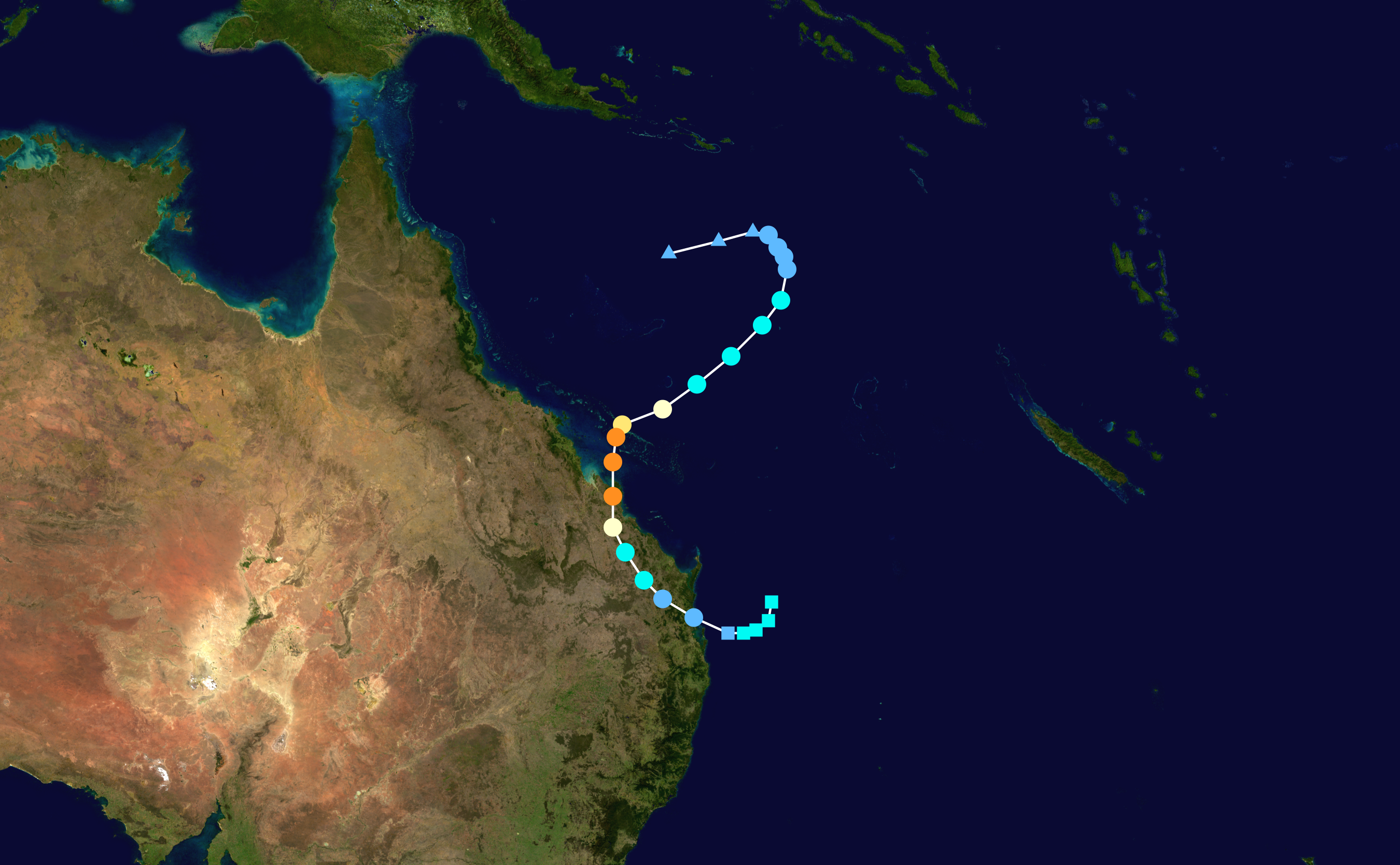
- Duration: 15 February – 26 February
- Peak intensity: 205 km/h (125 mph) (10-min); 932 hPa (mbar)

On 16 February, the BoM started to monitor a weak tropical disturbance in the Coral Sea. It quickly developed into a Category 1 tropical cyclone on 18 February, earning the name Marcia. It was upgraded to Category 2 the following day when it was approximately 555 kilometres (345 mi) north of Bundaberg and again upgraded to Category 3 severe tropical cyclone when approximately 290 kilometres (180 mi) north of Yeppoon. On 19 February, due to a developing, clear eye, the JTWC upgraded Marcia to a Category 2 whilst the BoM upgraded it as a Category 4. Due to explosive intensification, Marcia became a Category 5 according to the BoM early on 20 February. It affected Queensland, and last noted on 26th of the same month as it dissipated, west-southwest of New Caledonia.

The boat of two fishermen traveling to Fraser Island sank due to rough seas on the morning of 19 February, however, they were found safe and well on nearby Moon Boom Island the next morning. The storm wrought extensive damage in Queensland, with losses amounting to A$750 million (US$590.5 million).

=== Severe Tropical Cyclone Olwyn ===
- Category 3 severe tropical cyclone (Australian scale)
- Category 2 tropical cyclone (SSHWS)
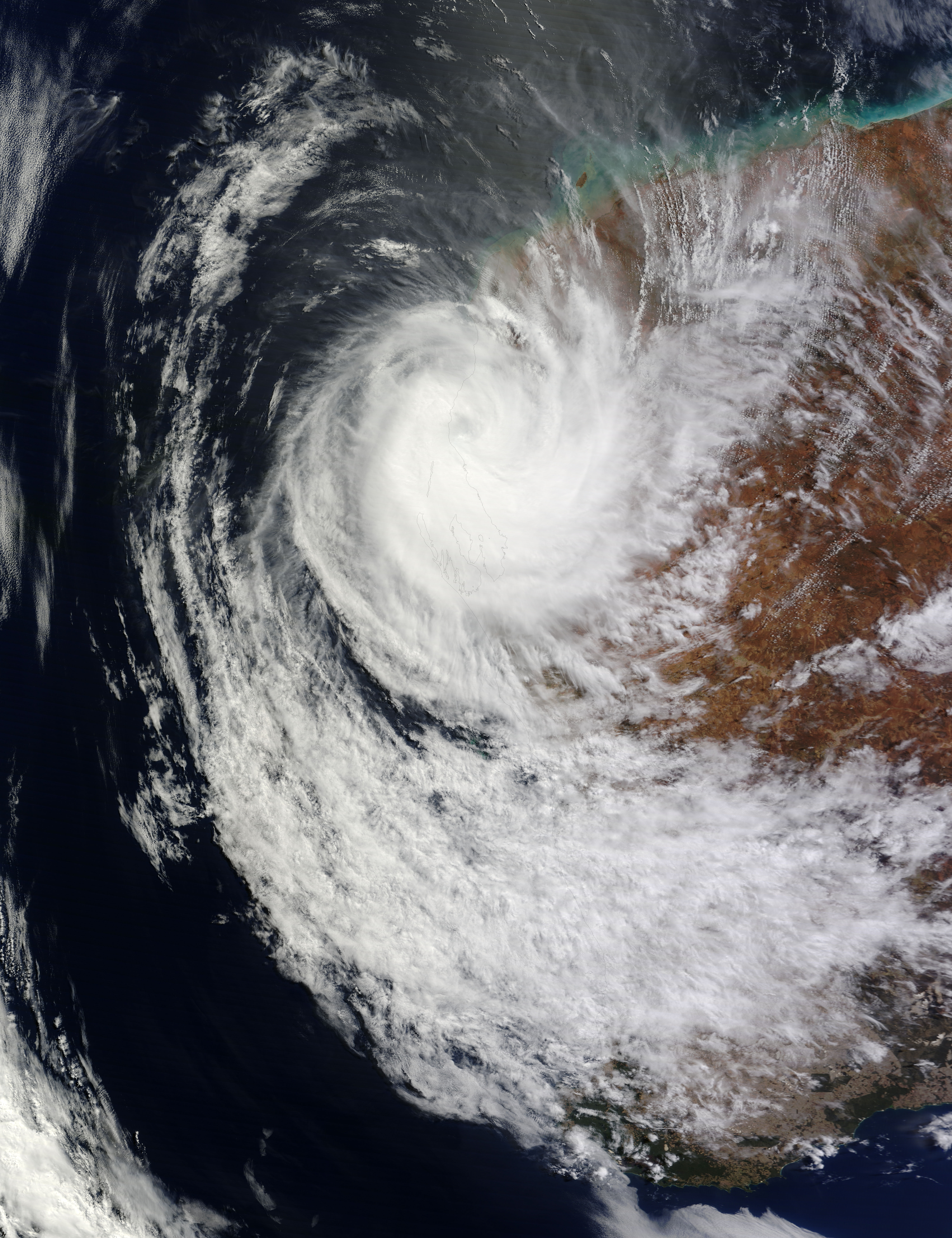
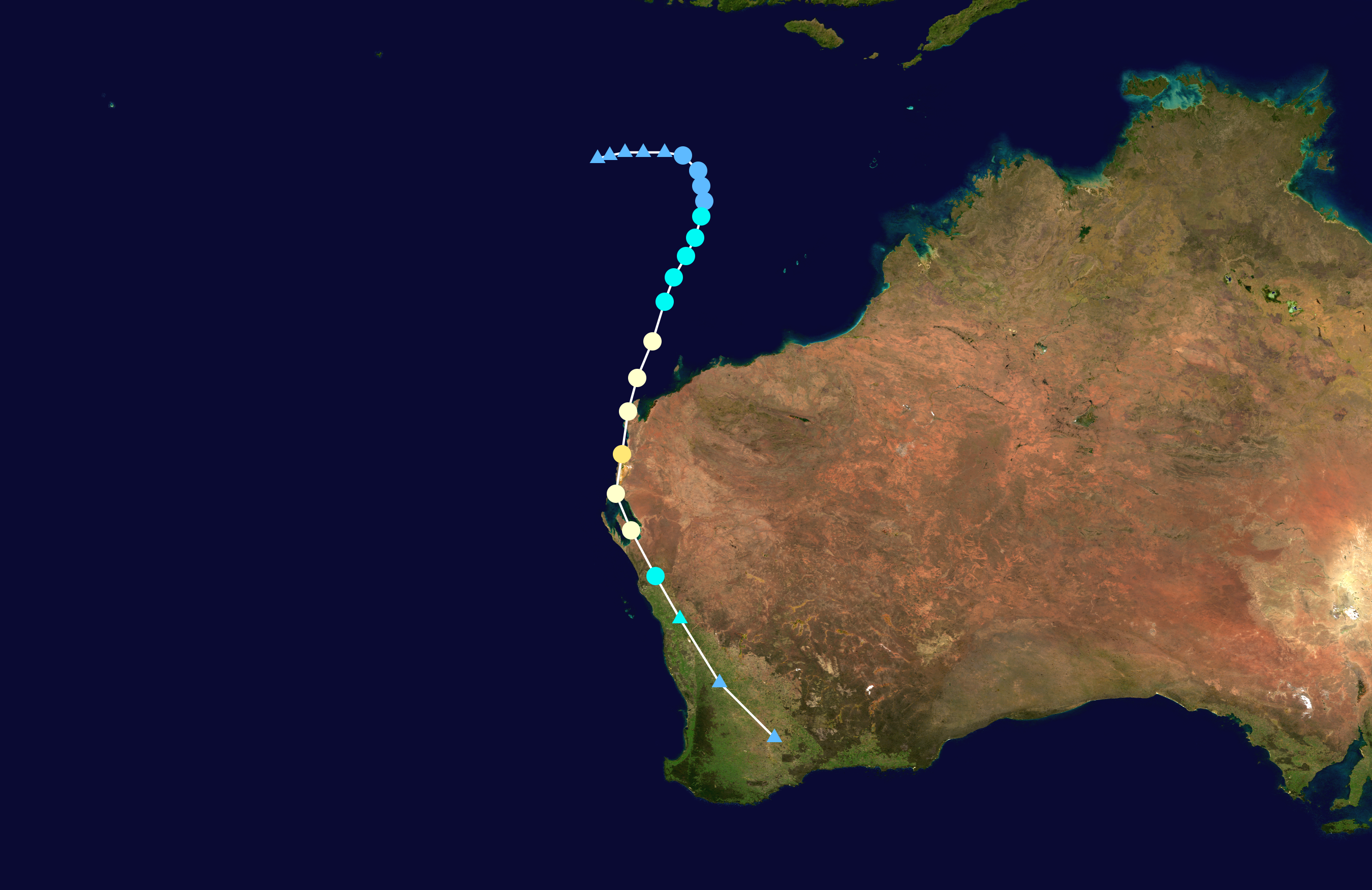
- Duration: 8 March – 14 March
- Peak intensity: 140 km/h (85 mph) (10-min); 955 hPa (mbar)

On 8 March, the BoM started to monitor a weak tropical low over Western Australia. The system was later designated as 16U a few days later. Due to an increase in convection, both the BoM and JTWC upgraded the system to a Category 1 tropical cyclone, naming it Olwyn on 11 March. Just before 12 March, Olwyn rapidly developed a ragged eye, as the BoM upgraded the system to a Category 3 severe tropical cyclone. Early on 13 March, Olwyn reached its peak strength of 140 km/h (85 mph) as the JTWC classified it as a Category 2 cyclone. However, after a few hours, the JTWC downgraded it to a Category 1 cyclone as it weakened from land interaction. On the same day, Olwyn made landfall over southwestern Australia as a weakening cyclone. Rapidly weakening inland, it emerged on the Southern Ocean as a decaying remnant low. It dissipated onwards.

Olwyn caused extensive damage along the coast of Western Australia, from Onslow to Kalbarri. In preparation for the storm, the Pilbara Ports authority closed the ports of Dampier and Ashburton. The entire workforce on Barrow Island was evacuated to the island's cyclone shelter. Upon landfall, a maximum wind gust of 180 km/h (110 mph) was recorded at Learmonth. Trees were uprooted and power was cut for several days. Damage was more severe further south at Carnarvon where most houses are not built to cyclone standards, unlike in Exmouth. Olwyn passed over the town at category 3 status, unroofing and severely damaging multiple houses, while many sheds and outbuildings were totally destroyed. One person was killed in a storm-related car accident. Total damage in Carnarvon was estimated to be in excess of A$100 million (US$76.3 million), and Olwyn has been noted as the most severe cyclone to have hit the town since 1950.

On 15 March Olwyn's remnants brought severe storms to the Southern Western Australia. Olwyn was the first ex-tropical cyclone to affect Geraldton, the Wheatbelt region and Perth since Cyclone Iggy in 2012.

=== Severe Tropical Cyclone Nathan ===
- Category 3 severe tropical cyclone (Australian scale)
- Category 3 tropical cyclone (SSHWS)
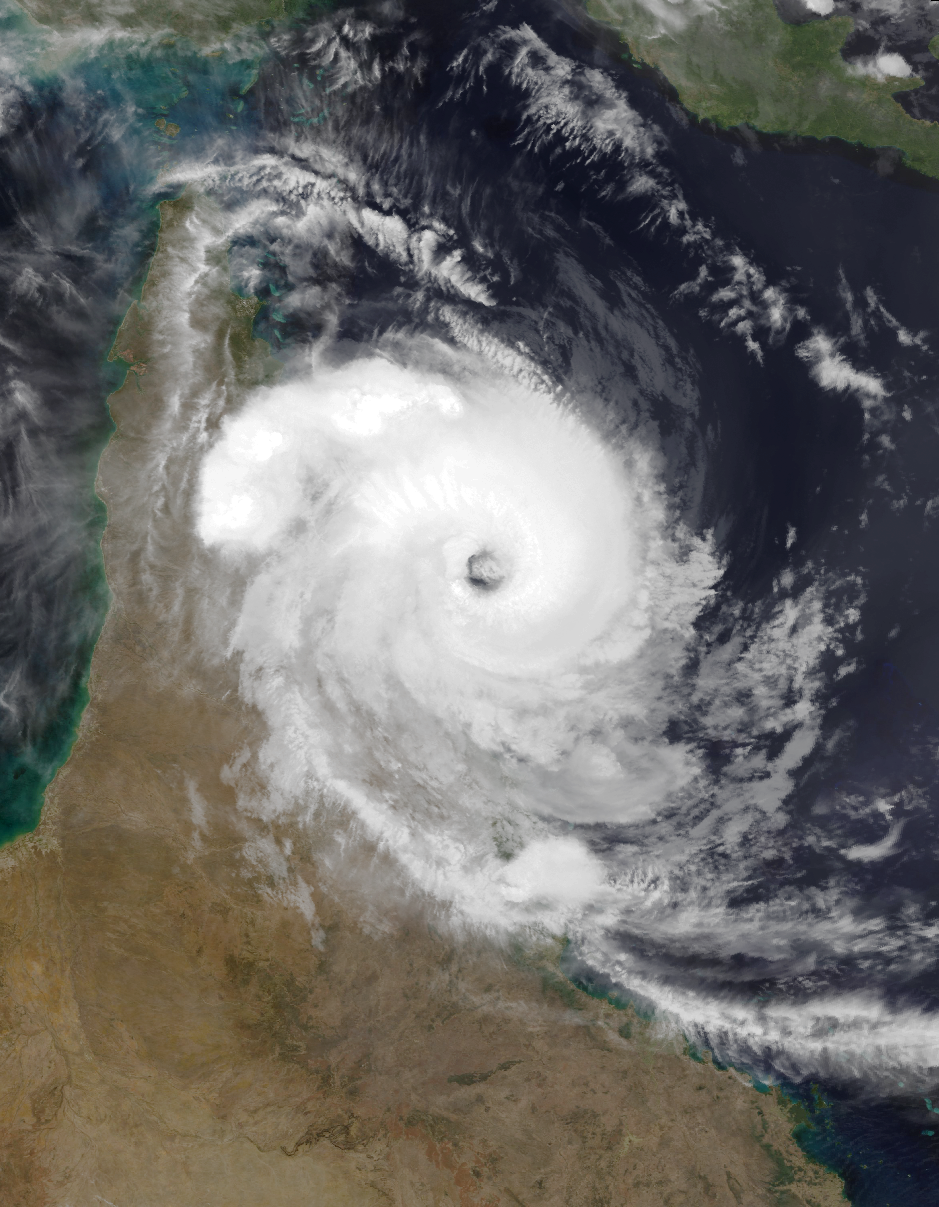
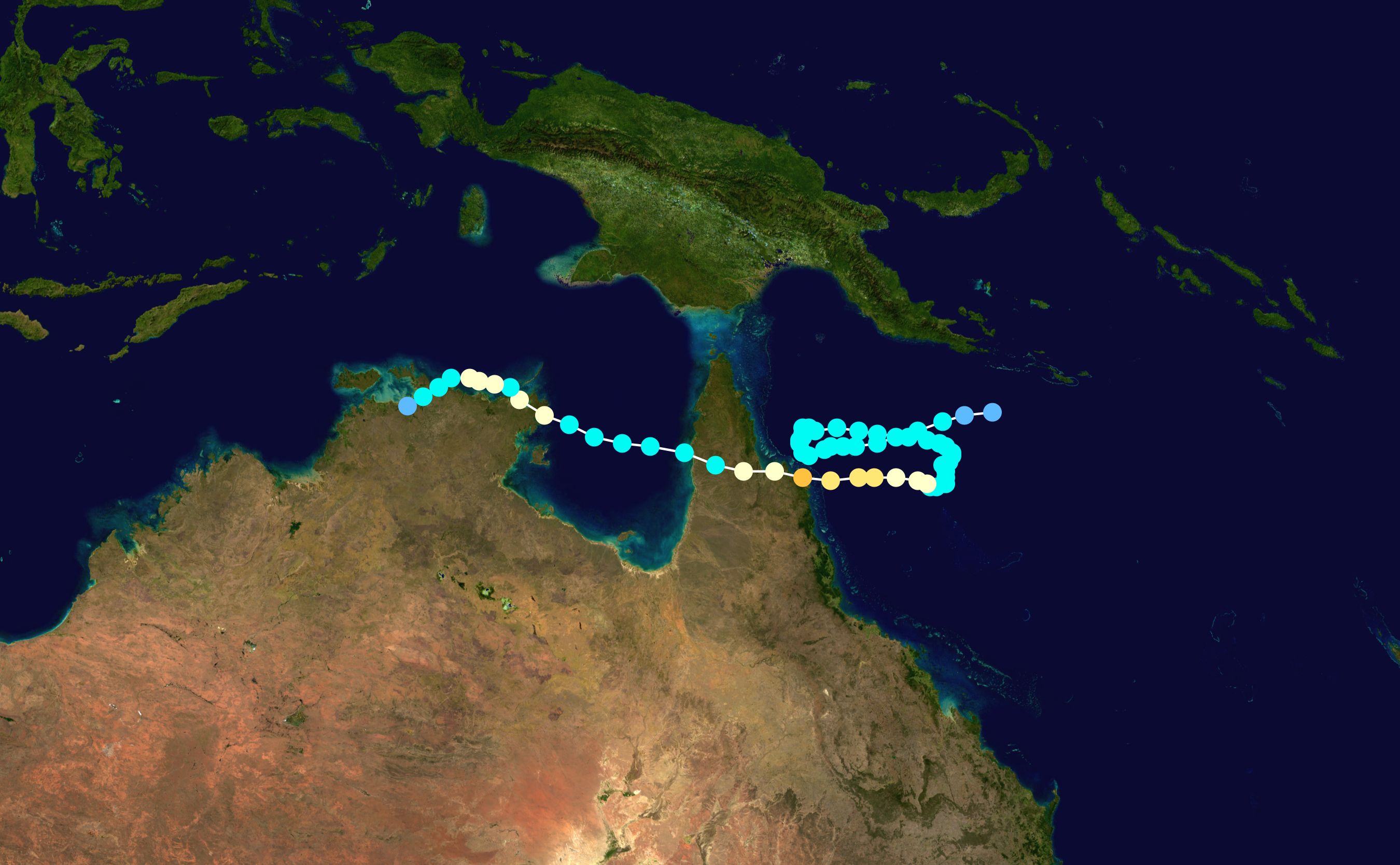
- Duration: 9 March – 25 March
- Peak intensity: 150 km/h (90 mph) (10-min); 969 hPa (mbar)

Shortly after Cyclone Pam was classified on the South Pacific, the outer rainbands of Pam led to the formation of a tropical low near Australia on 9 March. Later that day, the BoM designated the system as 17U and intensified into Tropical Cyclone Nathan several hours later. It slowly executed a cyclonic loop over the next few days, moving across Arnhem Land. After intensifying to an initial peak intensity of 165 km/h (105 mph), Nathan weakened while crossing the Cape York Peninsula and reintensified over the Gulf of Carpentaria. It impacted Arnhem Land as an equivalent of a Category 1 cyclone, before hitting Darwin, Northern Territory the same day. It dissipated afterwards. The remnants of Nathan brought 106 mm (4.2 in) of rainfall to Onslow, Western Australia on 30 March. Cyclone Nathan hit the Arnhem Land one month after Cyclone Lam.

Total damage in northern Queensland were about A$74.8 million (US$57 million).

=== Severe Tropical Cyclone Ikola ===
- Category 4 severe tropical cyclone (Australian scale)
- Category 4 tropical cyclone (SSHWS)
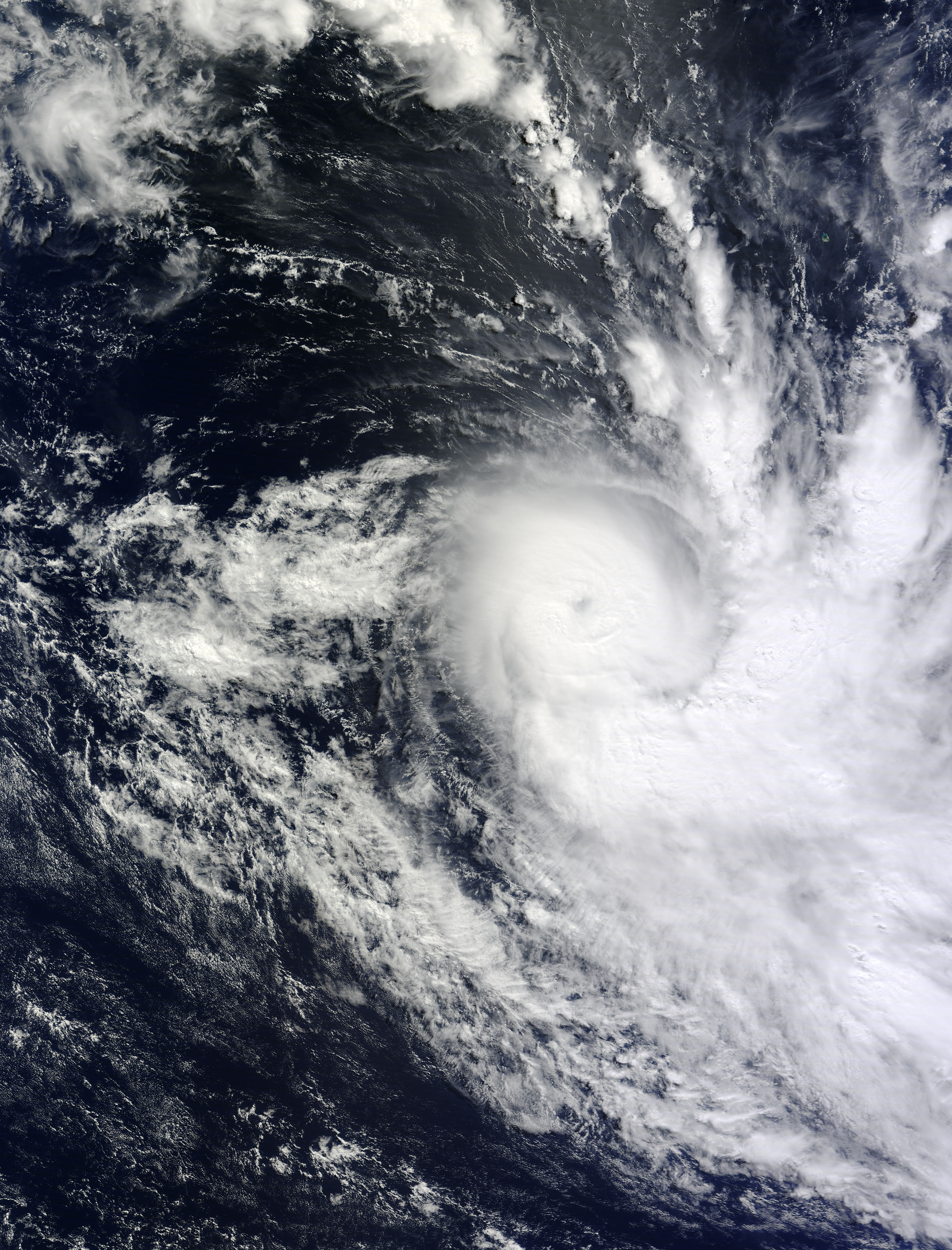
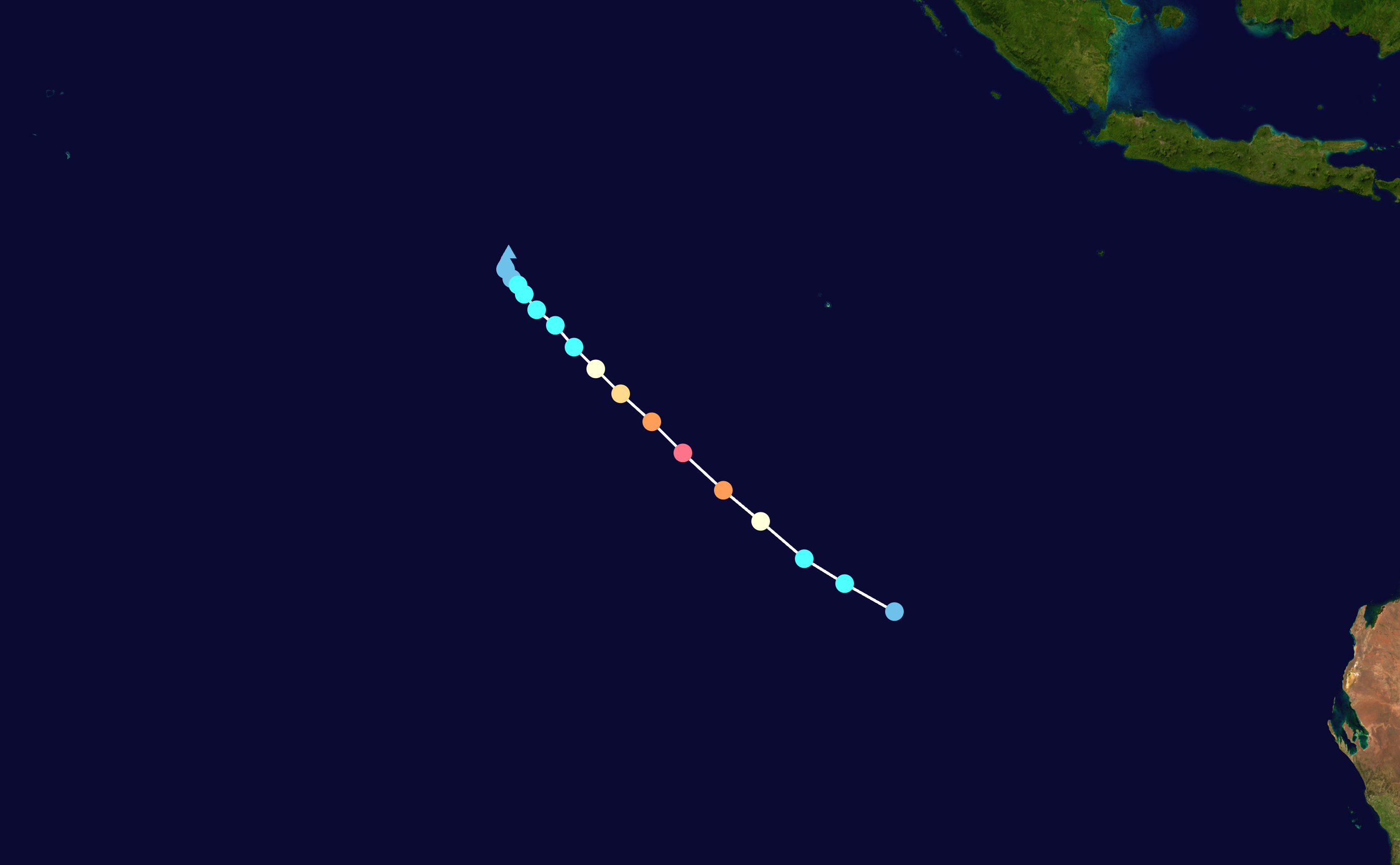
- Duration: 6 April (Entered basin) – 8 April
- Peak intensity: 175 km/h (110 mph) (10-min); 953 hPa (mbar)

On 6 April, the BoM had reported that Ikola had entered the basin as a severe tropical cyclone from the Southwest Indian Ocean basin and was designated as 19U. Ikola rapidly weakened due to moving into a region of increasing wind shear, becoming a category 3 tropical cyclone by the evening of 7 April. Along with decreasing sea surface temperatures and further increases of wind shear caused Ikola to weaken more to a tropical low on the afternoon of 8 April. The low then proceeded to become a trough system, bringing heavy rainfall to the southwestern parts of Western Australia and severe storms to the southeast of Western Australia. Ikola soaked Central Western Australia and affected Perth from 6–12 April.

Ikola was also the first cyclone to move into the Australian basin from the Southwest Indian Ocean basin since Cyclone Alenga in 2011.

=== Severe Tropical Cyclone Quang ===
- Category 4 severe tropical cyclone (Australian scale)
- Category 4 tropical cyclone (SSHWS)
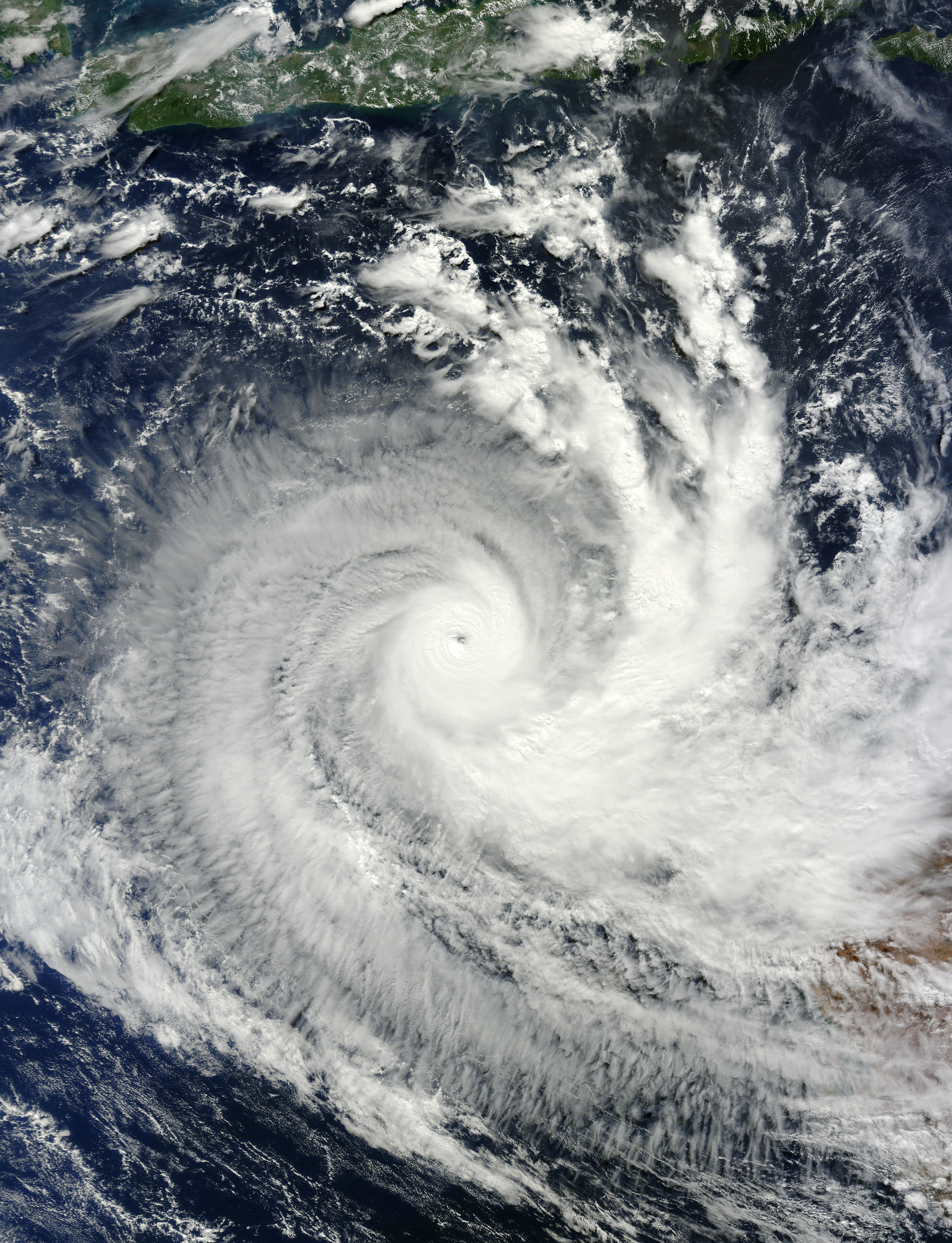
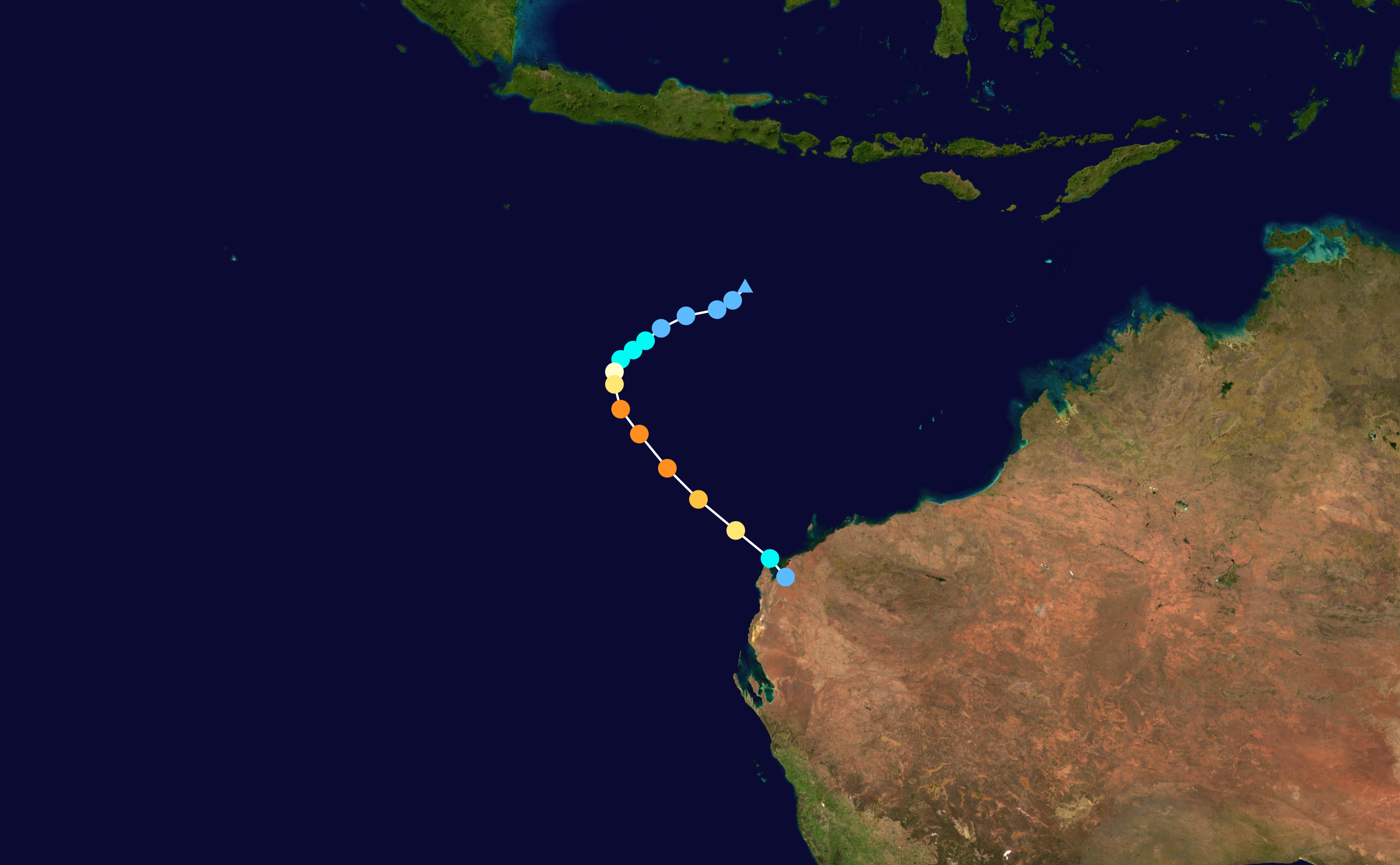
- Duration: 27 April – 1 May
- Peak intensity: 185 km/h (115 mph) (10-min); 950 hPa (mbar)

On 27 April, the BoM started to monitor a tropical low over Western Australia that had formed from a monsoon trough. Later that day, the system gradually intensified as it was designated as 21U. The next day, 21U intensified into Tropical Cyclone Quang. Quang proceeded to intensify rapidly during 29 and 30 April, reaching a maximum intensity of a category 4 severe tropical cyclone. Quang was located 600 km northwest of the North West Cape region before turning in a southeast direction. Quang moved southeast during 1 May while rapidly weakening due to an increase of wind shear, disrupting the cyclones structure in the process. Quang was downgraded to a category 3 severe tropical cyclone in the morning of 1 May and continued to weaken during the course of the day, becoming a Category 1 before making landfall near the Exmouth coast on the night of 1 May and quickly weakened to a tropical low after it hit Exmouth. It dissipated thereafter. Quang did minimal damage to Exmouth, Western Australia.

=== Tropical Low 22U ===
- Tropical low (Australian scale)
- Duration: 12 May – 14 May

=== Tropical Cyclone Raquel ===
- Category 1 tropical cyclone (Australian scale)
- Tropical storm (SSHWS)
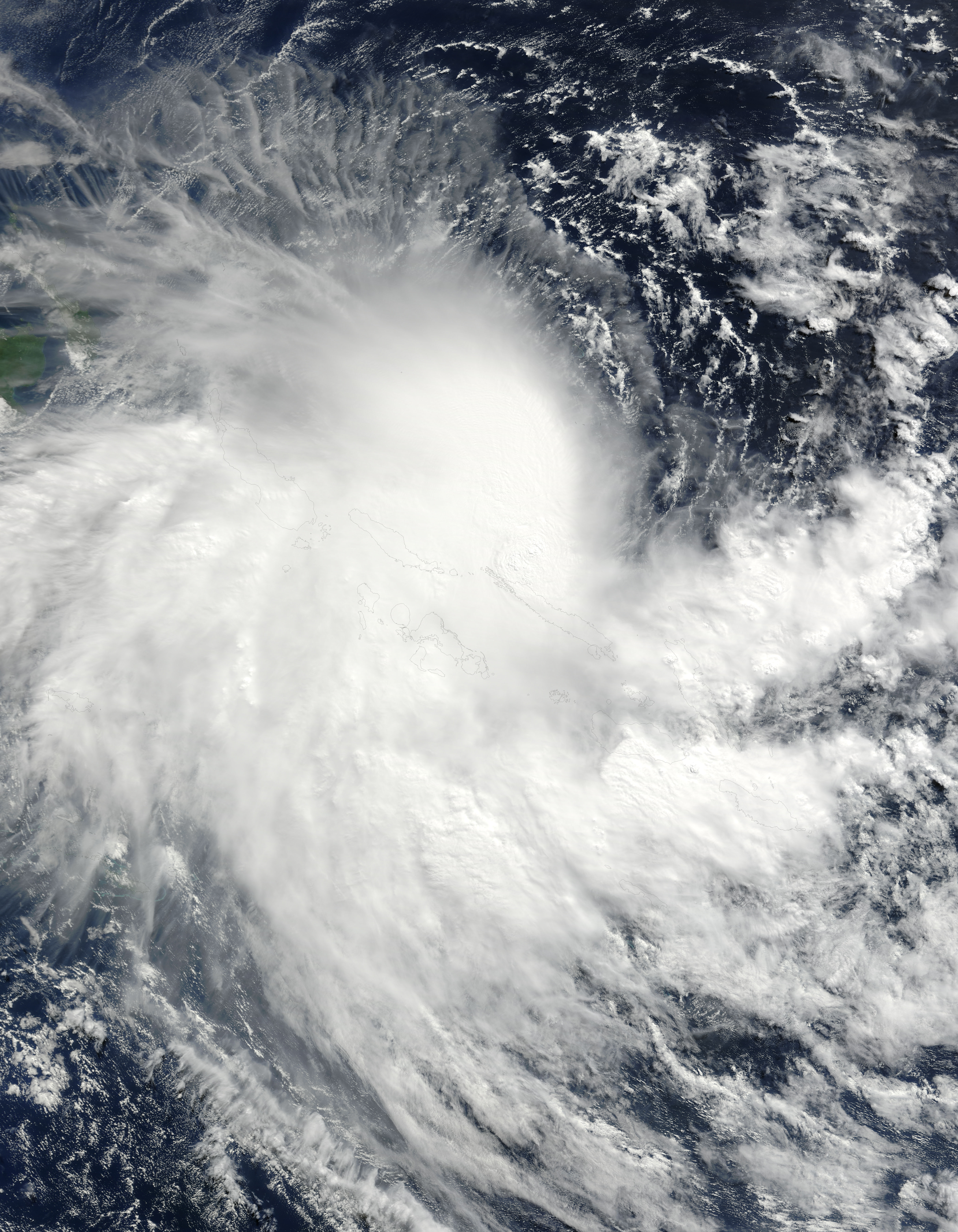
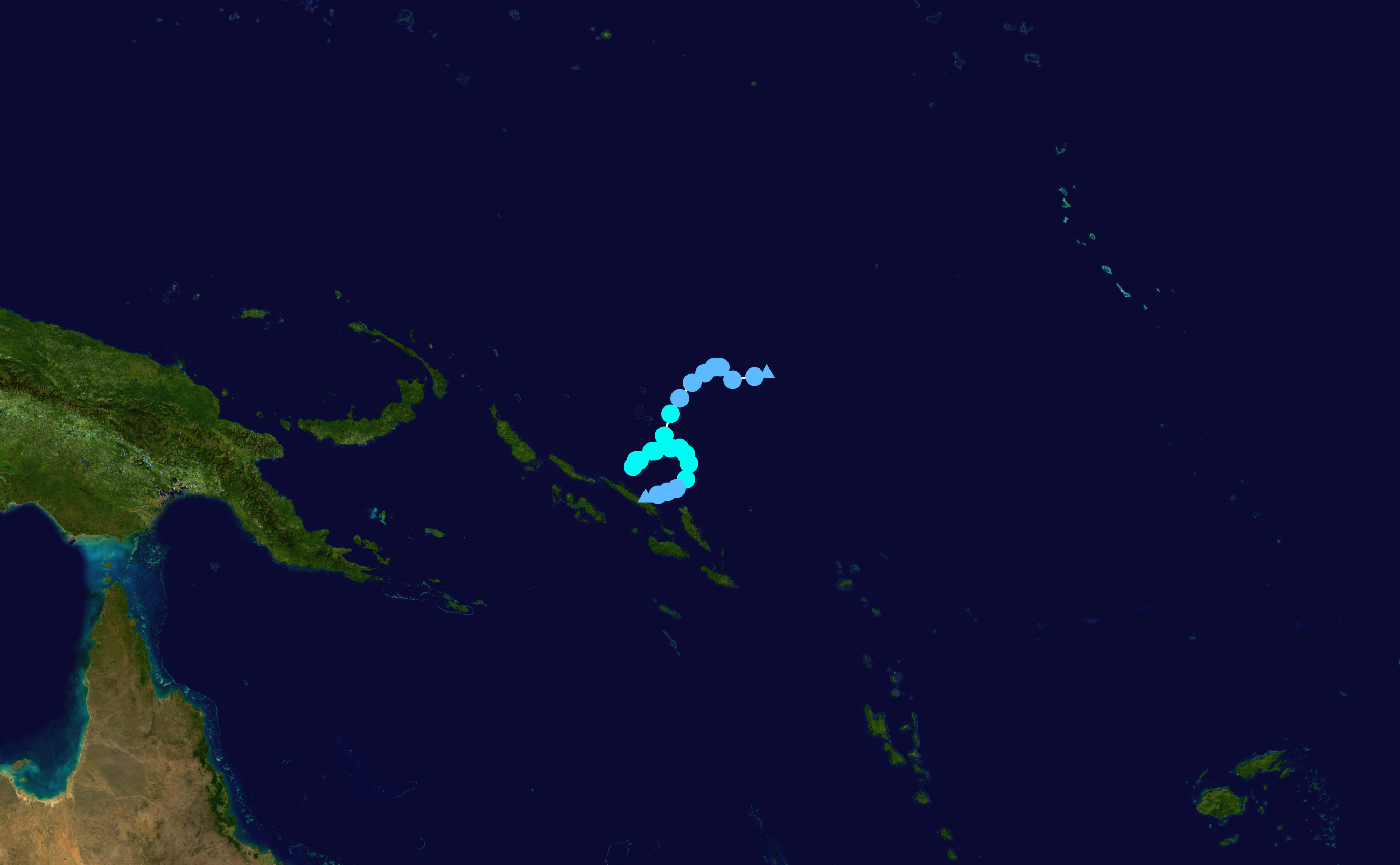
- Duration: 30 June (Entered basin) – 5 July
- Peak intensity: 65 km/h (40 mph) (10-min); 996 hPa (mbar)

Late on 30 June, Tropical Depression 17F moved into the Australian region from the South Pacific and intensified gradually into Tropical Cyclone Raquel. After drifting for the next two days, it exited the basin, moving back into the South Pacific. However, Raquel re-entered the basin early on 4 July as a weakening depression. The next day, Raquel was declared a remnant low.

According to the Bureau of Meteorology, it is the only known instance of a tropical cyclone during July in the region since the satellite era began (since at least 1970) until Tropical Cyclone 01U in 2022. As a byproduct of becoming a tropical cyclone on the first day of the new cyclone year, it marked the earliest start to a season in the basin on record.

=== Other systems ===
On 13 December, TCWC Perth reported that a tropical low had developed, to the south of the Indonesian island of Java. Conditions surrounding the system were unfavourable for further development over the next few days, however, TCWC Perth thought that there was a small chance that conditions could improve. Over the next few days, the system moved south-westwards, before it was last noted on 15 December, as it was not expected to develop further.

== Storm names ==
During the season a total of 7 tropical cyclones received a name from BoM, either by TCWC Perth, Darwin, or Brisbane, when the system was judged to have 10-minute sustained windspeeds of 65 km/h (40 mph). There has only been one list that the Bureau of Meteorology have assigned names to tropical cyclones since the 2008–09 season. Moreover, TCWC Jakarta named its first cyclone since 2010, and used the name Bakung. Tropical cyclones named by the TCWC Port Moresby are rare, with the last named cyclone occurring during 2007.

- Kate
- Lam
- Marcia
- Nathan
- Olwyn
- Quang
- Raquel

Four cyclone names would be replaced this season, with Lam, Marcia, Olwyn and Quang being retired and replaced with Laszlo, Mingzhu, Oriana and Quincey respectively.

== Season effects ==
This is a table of all storms in the 2014–15 Australian region cyclone season. It mentions all of the season's storms and their names, duration, peak intensities, damage, and death totals. Deaths in parentheses are additional and indirect (an example of an indirect death would be a traffic accident), but were still related to that storm. Damage and deaths include totals while the storm was extratropical, a wave, or a low, and all the damage figures are in 2014 USD.

Name	Dates	Peak intensity			Areas affected	Damages (AU$)	Damages (US$)	Deaths
Name	Dates	Category	Wind speed (km/h (mph))	Pressure (hPa)	Areas affected	Damages (AU$)	Damages (US$)	Deaths
01U	3–4 December	Tropical low	55 km/h (35 mph)	1,000 hPa (29.53 inHg)	None	None	None	None
Bakung	10–13 December	Category 2 tropical cyclone	95 km/h (60 mph)	991 hPa (29.26 inHg)	Indonesia	None	None	
03U	13–15 December	Tropical low	Not specified	Not specified	None	None	None	None
Kate	21 - 30 December	Category 3 severe tropical cyclone	150 km/h (90 mph)	967 hPa (28.56 inHg)	None	None	None	
05U	2–10 January	Tropical low	Not specified	Not specified	Western Australia	Minimal	Minimal	None
06U	10–13 January	Tropical low	Not specified	Not specified	None	None	None	None
07U	10–13 January	Tropical low	55 km/h (35 mph)	998 hPa (29.47 inHg)	Solomon Islands	None	None	None
08U	16–20 January	Tropical low	30 km/h (20 mph)	1,003 hPa (29.62 inHg)	Western Australia	None	None	None
12U	13–16 February	Tropical low	Not specified	Not specified	None	None	None	None
Lam	13–20 February	Category 4 severe tropical cyclone	185 km/h (115 mph)	943 hPa (27.85 inHg)	Queensland, Northern Territory, Western Australia	$100 million	$78.1 million	None
Marcia	15–26 February	Category 5 severe tropical cyclone	205 km/h (125 mph)	930 hPa (27.46 inHg)	Queensland	$750 million	$587 million	None
Olwyn	8–14 March	Category 3 severe tropical cyclone	140 km/h (85 mph)	955 hPa (28.20 inHg)	Western Australia	$100 million	$76.3 million	1
Nathan	9–25 March	Category 4 severe tropical cyclone	165 km/h (105 mph)	963 hPa (28.44 inHg)	Queensland, Northern Territory, Western Australia	$74.8 million	$57 million	None
Ikola	6–8 April	Category 4 severe tropical cyclone	175 km/h (110 mph)	953 hPa (28.14 inHg)	None	None	None	None
Quang	27 April – 1 May	Category 4 severe tropical cyclone	185 km/h (115 mph)	950 hPa (28.05 inHg)	Western Australia	Minimal	Minimal	None
22U	12–14 May	Tropical low	Not specified	Not specified	Solomon Islands	None	None	None
Raquel	30 June – 5 July	Category 1 tropical cyclone	65 km/h (40 mph)	996 hPa (29.41 inHg)	Solomon Islands	Minimal	Minimal	1
Season aggregates
17 systems	3 December – 5 July		205 km/h (125 mph)	930 hPa (27.46 inHg)		$798 million	2	

== See also ==
- Australian region tropical cyclone
- Tropical cyclones in 2014 and 2015
- List of Southern Hemisphere tropical cyclone seasons
- Atlantic hurricane seasons: 2014, 2015
- Pacific hurricane seasons: 2014, 2015
- Pacific typhoon seasons: 2014, 2015
- North Indian Ocean cyclone seasons: 2014, 2015
- 2014–15 South-West Indian Ocean cyclone season
- 2014–15 South Pacific cyclone season
- South Atlantic tropical cyclone
