= Cyclone Raquel =

Category 1 tropical cyclone in 2015

Tropical Cyclone Raquel
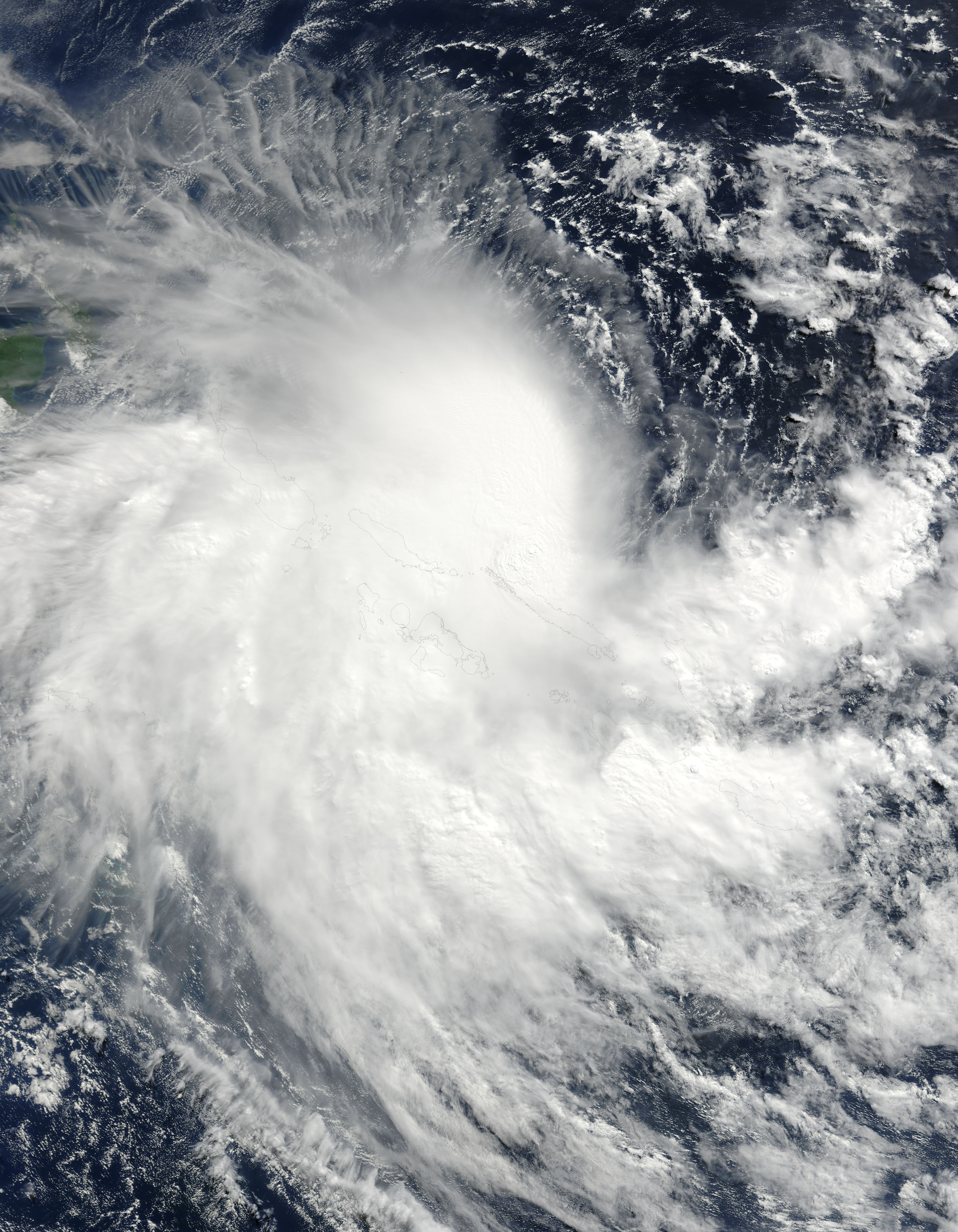
- Raquel prior to peak strength on June 30

Meteorological history
- Formed: June 28, 2015
- Dissipated: July 5, 2015

Category 1 tropical cyclone
- 10-minute sustained (BOM)
- Highest winds: 65 km/h (40 mph)
- Lowest pressure: 996 hPa (mbar); 29.41 inHg

Tropical storm
- 1-minute sustained (SSHWS/JTWC)
- Highest winds: 85 km/h (50 mph)
- Lowest pressure: 989 hPa (mbar); 29.21 inHg

Overall effects
- Fatalities: 1 direct
- Missing: 8
- Damage: Minimal
- Areas affected: Solomon Islands
- IBTrACS
- Part of the 2014–15 South Pacific cyclone season and 2014–15 Australian region cyclone season

Tropical Cyclone Raquel was the first tropical cyclone to exist within the South Pacific Ocean during the month of July on record. The system was first noted during June 28, 2015, while it was located to the northeast of Honiara in the Solomon Islands within the South Pacific basin. Over the next few days the system moved south-westwards towards the Solomon Islands, under the influence of a ridge of high pressure and gradually developed further. The system was subsequently named Raquel during June 30, as it moved into the Australian region and developed into a Category 1 tropical cyclone on the Australian tropical cyclone intensity scale. Strong vertical wind shear subsequently limited further development of the system, with atmospheric convection surrounding the system displaced to the west and south of the system. The system subsequently weakened into a tropical depression during July 2, after it had recurved and move eastwards into the South Pacific basin. During that day atmospheric convection surrounding the system improved, as it started to move towards the south-southwest and the Australian region. Raquel subsequently passed near or over several of the Solomon Islands between July 3–5, before it was last noted to the south-west of Guadalcanal during July 5, as it rapidly lost its tropical characteristics.

Raquel brought major flooding to the Solomon Islands where significant damage took place; including a large amount of agricultural damage and structural damage to hundreds of homes.

== Meteorological history ==
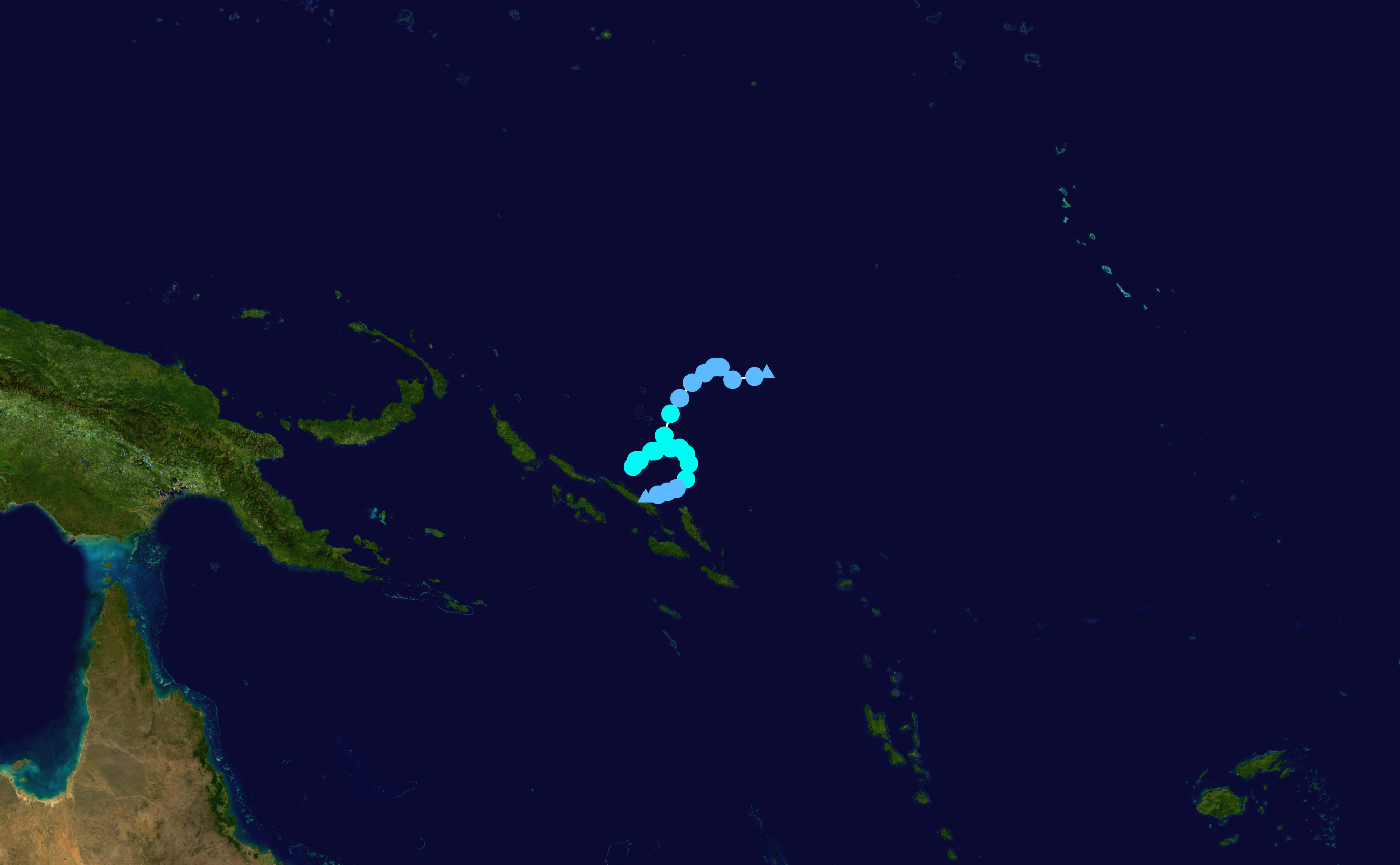
Map plotting the storm's track and intensity, according to the Saffir–Simpson scale Map key Saffir–Simpson scale Tropical depression (≤38 mph, ≤62 km/h) Tropical storm (39–73 mph, 63–118 km/h) Category 1 (74–95 mph, 119–153 km/h) Category 2 (96–110 mph, 154–177 km/h) Category 3 (111–129 mph, 178–208 km/h) Category 4 (130–156 mph, 209–251 km/h) Category 5 (≥157 mph, ≥252 km/h) Unknown Storm type Tropical cyclone Subtropical cyclone Extratropical cyclone, remnant low, tropical disturbance, or monsoon depression

During June 2015, a near record strength pulse in the Madden–Julian oscillation lead to a period of significant weather across the Western Pacific. This significant weather included a major westerly wind burst during late June, which caused a set of twin tropical cyclones to develop. The first tropical cyclone developed in the Northern Hemisphere during June 29, before it later developed into Typhoon Chan-hom. The second tropical cyclone was first noted by the Fiji Meteorological Service (FMS) and the Australian Bureau of Meteorology (BoM) as Tropical Disturbance 17F and Tropical Low 24U during June 28, while it was located about 660 km (410 mi) to the northeast of Honiara in the Solomon Islands. This system had a well-defined low level circulation centre which was located within an environment, that was marginally favourable for further development with low-moderate vertical wind shear offset by a poleward outflow. The system subsequently moved south-westwards towards the Solomon Islands under the influence of a ridge of high pressure and gradually developed further and was classified as Tropical Depression 17F during the next day.

The United States Joint Typhoon Warning Center (JTWC) subsequently issued a Tropical Cyclone Formation Alert during June 30, after the systems chances of becoming a significant tropical cyclone within 24 hours became high. Later that day as the system approached 160°E and the border between the South Pacific Basin and the Australian Region, the JTWC initiated advisories on the system and designated it as Tropical Cyclone 25P. 17F was subsequently named Raquel at 18:00 UTC (04:00 July 1, Australian Eastern Standard Time) by the BoM, after the system had developed into a Category 1 tropical cyclone on the Australian tropical cyclone intensity scale. Throughout the following day, the BoM expected the system to intensify further and possibly become a Category 2 tropical cyclone, as it moved towards the Solomon Islands. However, strong vertical wind shear limited development of the system, with atmospheric convection surrounding the system displaced to the west and south of the system. As a result, Raquel had peaked as a Category 1 tropical cyclone, with 10-minute sustained wind speeds of 65 km/h (40 mph). The system subsequently weakened into a tropical depression during July 2, after it had recurved and moved eastwards into the South Pacific basin. During that day atmospheric convection surrounding the system initially improved, as it started to move towards the south-southwest and the Australian region. Raquel subsequently passed near or over several of the Solomon Islands between July 3–5, before it was last noted to the south-west of Guadalcanal during July 5, as it rapidly lost its tropical characteristics.

== Preparations and impact ==
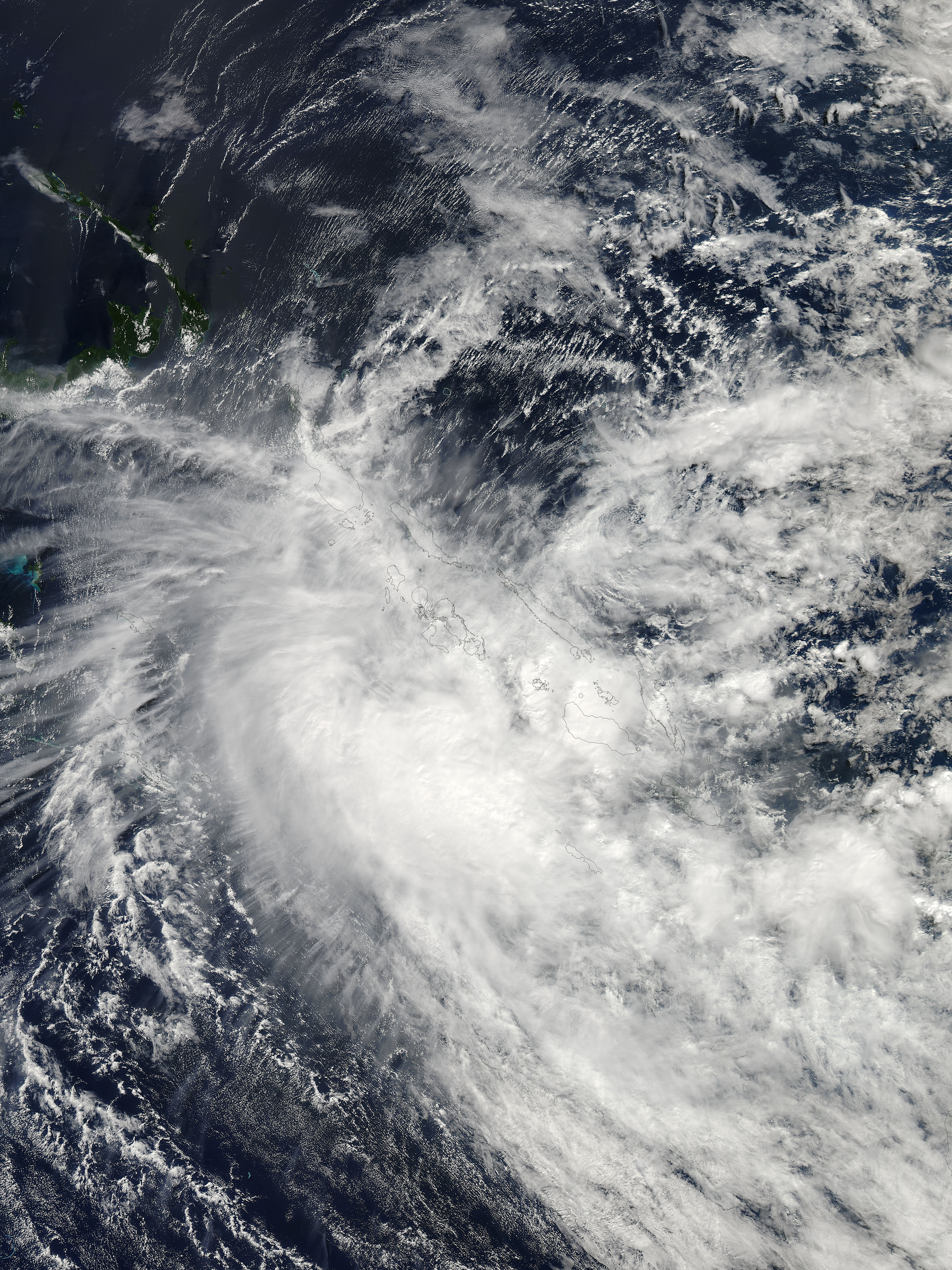
Tropical Depression Raquel meandering around Solomon Islands on July 2

Tropical Cyclone Raquel brought torrential rain, high seas and strong winds to the Solomon Islands throughout its lifetime, with widespread and extensive damage reported as a result. As the system impacted the island nation, the Solomon Islands Meteorological Service issued various tropical disturbance and tropical cyclone watches and warnings. These watches and warnings warned that near gale-force winds of 55 km/h (35 mph) would develop over most of the Solomon Islands, while coastal flooding, heavy rain and squally thunderstorms were also expected. After Raquel had weakened into a tropical depression, residents were warned to still be prepared for flash floods and landslides with predictions of up to 100 mm (3.9 in) of rainfall in the Solomon Islands within a 24-hour period. In response to Raquel, the Solomon Islands Ministry of Health and the World Health Organization called on the public to maintain safe hygiene practices, including hand washing and boiling water before drinking it. As a result of the torrential rain, flash flooding was reported on several of the islands, which resulted in widespread damage in Malaita, Western, Choiseul and Isabel provinces. In particular thousands of food gardens were extensively damaged or destroyed, including 40 thousand in Malaita Province alone. One person was killed after being hit by a falling tree while 16 others were missing at sea. The Gold Ridge Mine on the island of Guadalcanal was declared a disaster zone by the Solomon Islands Government during July 7, after rainfall associated with Raquel brought the tailings dam to within 20 cm (10 in) of full capacity.

While Raquel was active, the Solomon Islands National Disaster Management Office activated their national disaster management arrangements. It also prompted various emergency response clusters to activate their action plans, in case of a deployment to support the provinces impacted by the system. Provincial assessment teams were subsequently deployed to various provinces during July 7, in order to provide humanitarian assistance and disaster relief to remote communities.

On July 14, the National Disaster Management Office in Australia announced that it would be working in conjunction with the Solomon Islands government to put together an assessment team to provide humanitarian assistance and disaster relief to remote communities.

On the same day the Gold Ridge tailing dam reached dangerous levels and began threatening communities living downstream due to heavy rainfall from Raquel. Officials signed a memorandum of understanding (MOU) agreeing to release small amounts of water to ease the pressure on the dam.

On July 21 the Red Cross estimated that floods which had been affecting the Solomon Islands since the end of June and were exacerbated by Raquel had affected about 10,000 people across the country. Communication to remote areas was cut due to washed out roadways and downed power lines. In response the Red Cross sent out radio messages to remote areas to help restore communications. The Dissemination Officer at Solomon Islands Red Cross explained that “The radio messages are to let people know where the assessment teams are travelling to and what they will be doing when they arrive. It’s important people understand that we are there to assess the damage and to identify who has been worst affected, so we can target our support to those who are most vulnerable.”

On July 22 the Solomon Islands Cabinet granted AU$3.3 million (US$2.44 million) for relief supplies including rice due to the destruction of the food gardens across the provinces.

The Solomon Islands Red Cross deployed volunteers to the affected areas.

== Historical significance ==
Since Raquel developed into a tropical cyclone at 18:00 UTC (04:00 July 1, Australian Eastern Standard Time), it is considered to be both the earliest and latest system to form in both the Australian region and South Pacific basin. It was also the first tropical cyclone to exist in the South Pacific Ocean during July on record, while it was the third tropical cyclone on record to exist in the Australian region that month. However, both records are considered patchy, as it is possible that tropical cyclones were missed by forecasters prior to satellite monitoring being introduced, while several tropical lows have also been monitored during July. The two tropical cyclones that were previously monitored in the Australian region during July, were Cyclone Lindsay (1996) and an unnamed cyclone in 2007, both of which entered the basin from the South-West Indian ocean.

== See also ==
- Cyclone Ida – another cyclone which also caused major damage in the Solomon Islands in late-May through early-June 1972
- List of off-season South Pacific tropical cyclones
