= List of storms named Katie =

The name Katie has been used for three tropical or subtropical cyclones worldwide, one in the Atlantic Ocean, and two in the Southern Hemisphere. It has also been used for one extratropical cyclone.

In the Atlantic:

- Hurricane Katie (1955) – made landfall in Hispaniola as a Category 2 hurricane

In the Southern Hemisphere:

- Cyclone Katie (1964) – a strong tropical cyclone that caused minor damage in the Northern Territory
- Subtropical Cyclone Katie (2015) – unofficial name given to a rare subtropical cyclone in the Southeast Pacific

In Europe:

- Storm Katie (2016) – extratropical cyclone that affected England.
