= Subtropical Cyclone Katie =

South Pacific subtropical cyclone in 2015

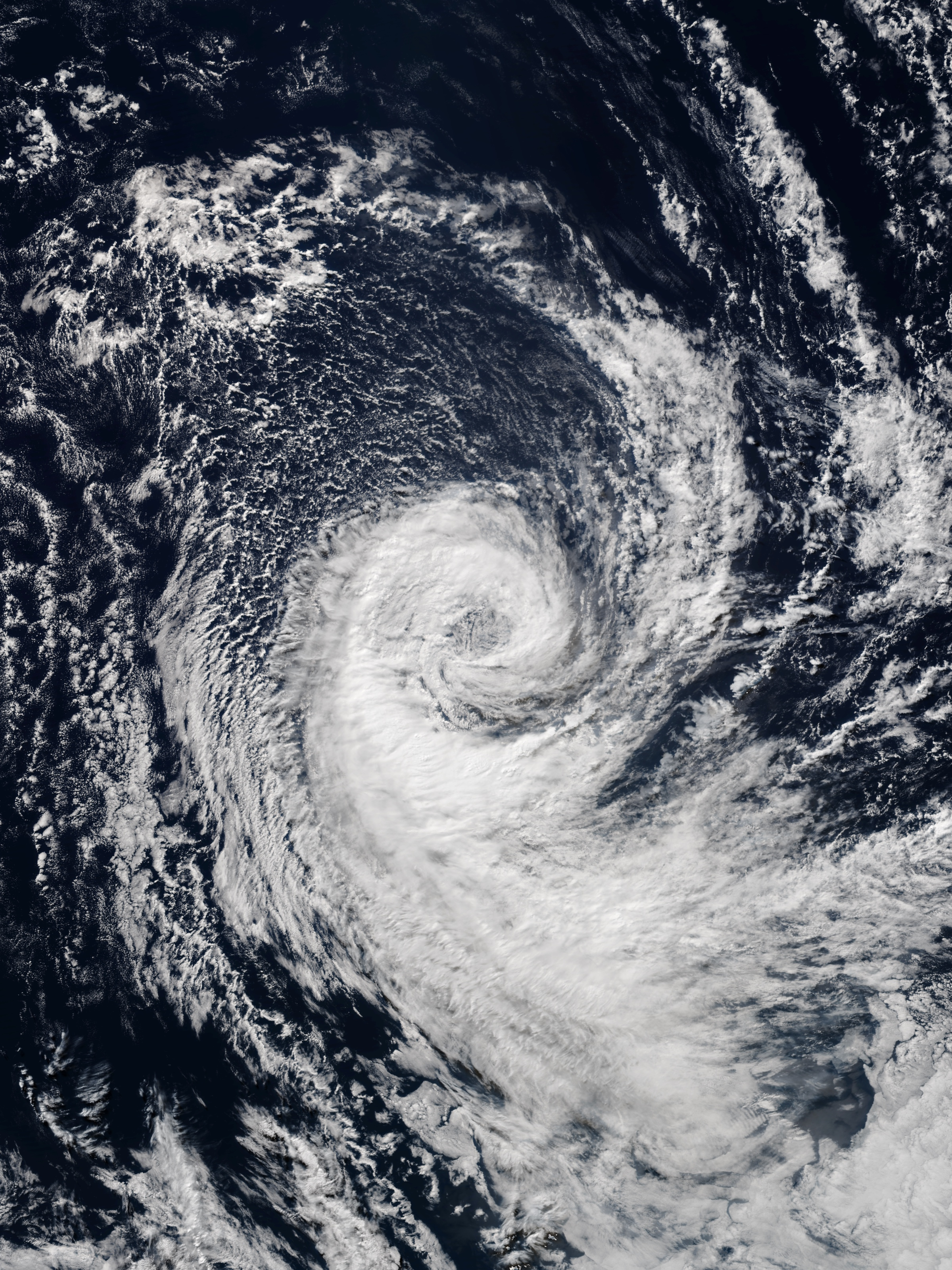
- The storm near peak intensity, on 2 May

Meteorological history
- Formed: 29 April 2015
- Remnant low: 4 May 2015
- Dissipated: 6 May 2015

Subtropical cyclone
- 1-minute sustained
- Highest winds: 75 km/h (45 mph)
- Lowest pressure: 993 hPa (mbar); 29.32 inHg

Overall effects
- Fatalities: None
- Damage: None
- Areas affected: Easter Island
- Part of the 2014–15 South Pacific cyclone season (unofficially)

Subtropical Cyclone Katie, unofficially named by researchers, was an unusual weather event in early 2015. After the 2014–15 South Pacific cyclone season had officially ended, a rare subtropical cyclone was identified outside of the basin near Easter Island, during early May, and was unofficially dubbed Katie by researchers. Katie was one of the few tropical or subtropical systems ever observed forming in the far Southeast Pacific, outside of the official basin boundary of 120°W, which marks the eastern edge of RSMC Nadi's and RSMC Wellington's warning areas, during the satellite era. Due to the fact that this storm developed outside of the official areas of responsibility of the warning agencies in the South Pacific, the storm was not officially included as a part of the 2014–15 South Pacific cyclone season. However, the Chilean Navy Weather Service issued High Seas Warnings on the system as an extratropical low.

== Meteorological history ==
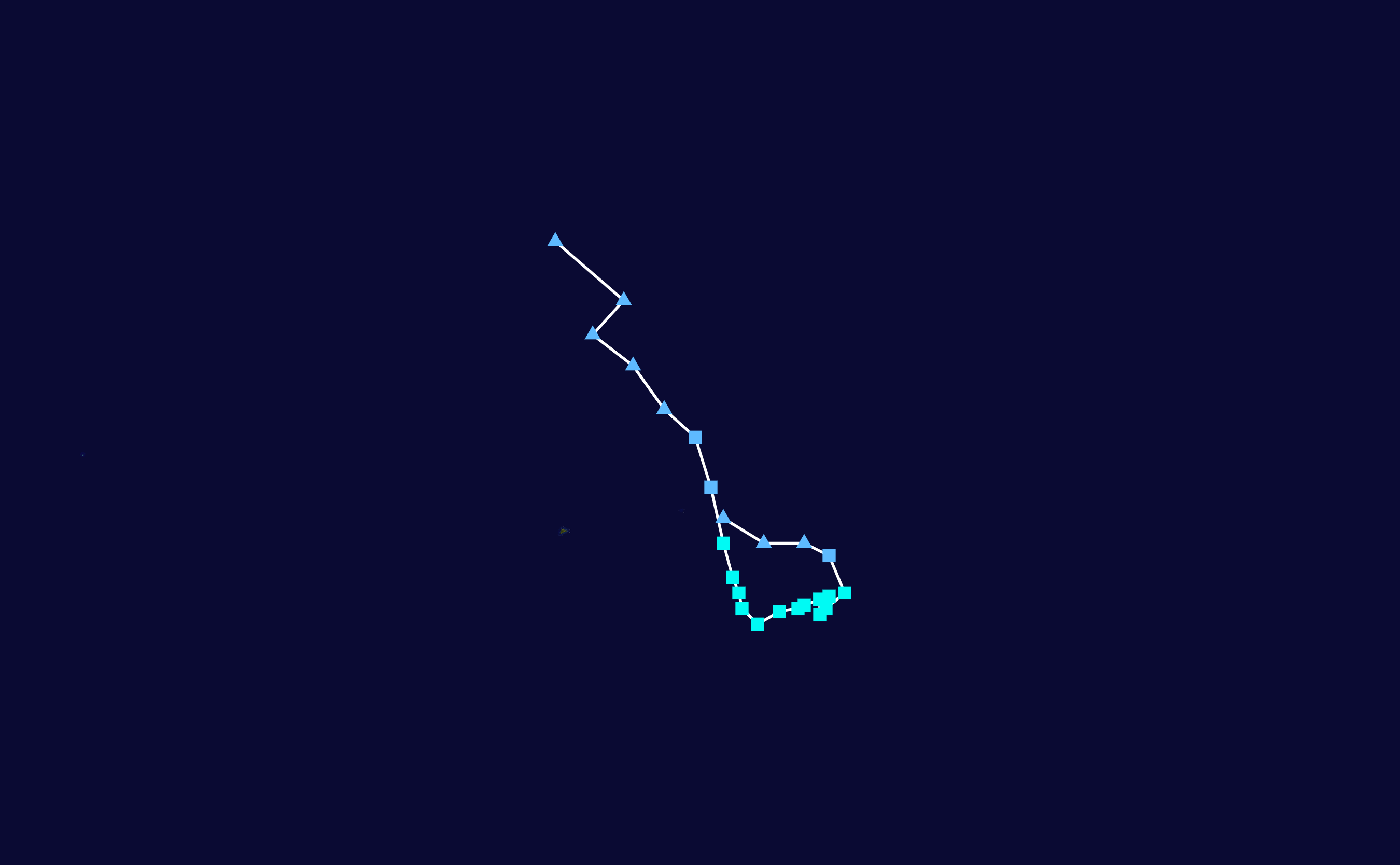
Map plotting the storm's track and intensity, according to the Saffir–Simpson scale Map key Saffir–Simpson scale Tropical depression (≤38 mph, ≤62 km/h) Tropical storm (39–73 mph, 63–118 km/h) Category 1 (74–95 mph, 119–153 km/h) Category 2 (96–110 mph, 154–177 km/h) Category 3 (111–129 mph, 178–208 km/h) Category 4 (130–156 mph, 209–251 km/h) Category 5 (≥157 mph, ≥252 km/h) Unknown Storm type Tropical cyclone Subtropical cyclone Extratropical cyclone, remnant low, tropical disturbance, or monsoon depression

On 29 April 2015, near the end of the 2014–15 South Pacific cyclone season, an extratropical disturbance developed in the far Southeastern Pacific, before transitioning into a subtropical depression soon afterward. The storm transitioned into a subtropical depression at 102.9°W, well to the east of the South Pacific basin's eastern boundary of 120°W. Around this time, the Chilean Navy Weather Service began including the storm in their High Seas Warnings, continuing this until 4 May. During the next couple of days, the system drifted to the southwest, before turning to the southeast. On 1 May, the storm intensified into a subtropical cyclone of tropical storm intensity, and looped westward. During this time, the system encountered sea surface temperatures about 1 °C (1.8 °F) above average and low wind shear, due to an extremely strong El Niño event, allowing the storm to organize further. On 2 May, the storm reached its peak intensity, with maximum sustained winds of 72 km/h (45 mph; 39 kn), (Note: All wind speeds in the article are maximum sustained winds sustained for one minute, unless otherwise noted.) and a minimum low pressure of 993 hPa (29.32 inHg). Around this time, the storm was identified by researchers and unofficially named Katie. During the next day, Katie slowly tracked westward while gradually weakening. On 4 May, Katie weakened into a subtropical depression and began accelerating to the northwest, passing to the east of Easter Island, before weakening further into a remnant low. With this degeneration, the Chilean Navy Weather Service ceased issuing warnings on the storm. On 6 May, Katie's remnant low dissipated. During Katie's entire existence, the storm remained east of 120°W, outside of the South Pacific basin's official boundary.

== Records ==
Subtropical Cyclone Katie is unofficially the third-easternmost tropical or subtropical cyclone ever observed to form in the South Pacific Ocean, transitioning into a subtropical system near 102.9°W. This broke the previous record of around 110°W, set by a tropical depression in May 1983. "Katie" was also the first tropical or subtropical system to form east of the South Pacific basin's official eastern boundary of 120°W since another tropical depression in May 1983. However, in May 2018, Katie's record was broken by Subtropical Cyclone Lexi, which formed just a few hundred miles off the coast of Chile, near 80°W. Tropical cyclogenesis is extremely rare in the far southeastern Pacific Ocean due to the cold sea-surface temperatures generated by the Humboldt Current, lack of tropical disturbance formation, and also due to unfavorable wind shear. As such, Cyclone Yaku in March 2023 is the only recorded instance of a tropical cyclone impacting western South America. Tropical cyclone formation in this extreme part of the Southeast Pacific is so rare that no warning agencies have yet been assigned to the region east of 120°W. Katie formed during an extremely strong El Niño event; the abnormally-warm waters 1 °C (1.8 °F) above average and low wind shear across the region may have contributed to the system's rare formation. Although Katie's observed characteristics were consistent with that of a subtropical cyclone, detailed analysis revealed that the storm may have briefly transitioned into a tropical cyclone, around the time of its peak intensity.

== See also ==
- Other storms of the same name
- Tropical cyclones in 2015
- Subtropical Cyclone Lexi
- Subtropical Cyclone Humberto
- 2006 Central Pacific cyclone
- Subtropical Storm 60W
- Subtropical Storm 96C
- Hurricane Catarina
- Tropical Storm Rolf
- Cyclone Qendresa
- Cyclone Numa
- Cyclone Ianos
- 1996 Lake Huron cyclone
- Mediterranean tropical-like cyclone
- South Atlantic tropical cyclone
- 1982–83 South Pacific cyclone season – Saw a tropical depression developing east of 120°W
- 2017–18 South Pacific cyclone season
- Tropical cyclogenesis
- El Niño–Southern Oscillation
