= Harda twin train derailment =

2015 railway accident in Madhya Pradesh, India

Details
- Date: 4 August 2015, 23:30 IST
- Location: Near Kurawan station, Harda district, Madhya Pradesh, India
- Coordinates: 22.22320°N 76.93053°E
- Country: India
- Line: Khandwa-Itarsi Railway line
- Operator: Indian Railways
- Incident type: Derailment
- Cause: Trackbed washed away

Statistics
- Trains: 2 (Kamayani Express and Janata Express)
- Vehicles: WAP-4 and WCAM-3
- Passengers: 300+
- Deaths: 31
- Injured: ~100
Route map

On 4 August 2015, two passenger trains – Kamayani Express and Janata Express – derailed near Kurawan and Bhringi railway station, 20 kilometres (12 mi) southwest of Harda, Madhya Pradesh. At least 31 people were killed and 100 people were injured.

== Derailment ==
The Kamayani Express, which was headed to Varanasi on the down line, derailed as flash floods (caused by Cyclonic Storm Komen) dislodged a culvert near the Machak river, causing track misalignment. The derailment resulted in some coaches becoming submerged in the river and some coaches blocking the up line. The Janata Express derailed near the same spot soon after. At least 31 people died and 100 people were injured. Several people were reported to be washed away by the river. Six coaches of the Kamayani Express and the engine plus the four coaches of the Janata Express derailed.

A train had safely crossed the bridge ten minutes before the first derailment. The river level was abnormally high, and flash floods gradually washed away the trackbed, resulting in sinking of the track. The driver of the Janata Express applied the brakes but could not stop the train from derailing.

== Rescue ==
Rescuers searched through the night for survivors and bodies. Over 300 people were rescued. The adverse weather conditions delayed the arrival of the rescue teams. Local residents were reported to have helped initially. By the morning of 5 August, the derailed trains had been removed and the bodies of the victims recovered. Over 25 trains traveling from Mumbai, Punjab, Uttar Pradesh, and Madhya Pradesh were stopped or diverted, mainly into neighboring Rajasthan.

== Investigation ==
The Commissioner for Railway Safety in the Central Railway zone opened an inquiry into the accident.

== See also ==
- 2015 North Indian Ocean cyclone season
- 2015 Myanmar floods
