= 2015 Myanmar floods =

Natural disaster

- Date: 16 July 2015–August 2015
- Location: Myanmar
- Deaths: 103

Severe flooding in Myanmar began in July 2015 and continued into September, affecting 12 of the country's 14 states, resulting in at least 103 deaths and affecting up to 1,000,000 people. Most of the casualties were reported from the Irrawaddy Delta. Torrential rains that began on 16 July destroyed farmland, roads, rail tracks, bridges and houses, leading the government to declare a state of emergency on 30 July in the four worst-hit regions in the west—Magway Division, Sagaing Division, Chin State and Rakhine State.

Myanmar's Ministry of Agriculture reported that more than 1.29 million acres of farmland have been inundated and 687,200 acres damaged. Moreover, 15,239 houses were destroyed, according to OCHA figures.

== Background ==
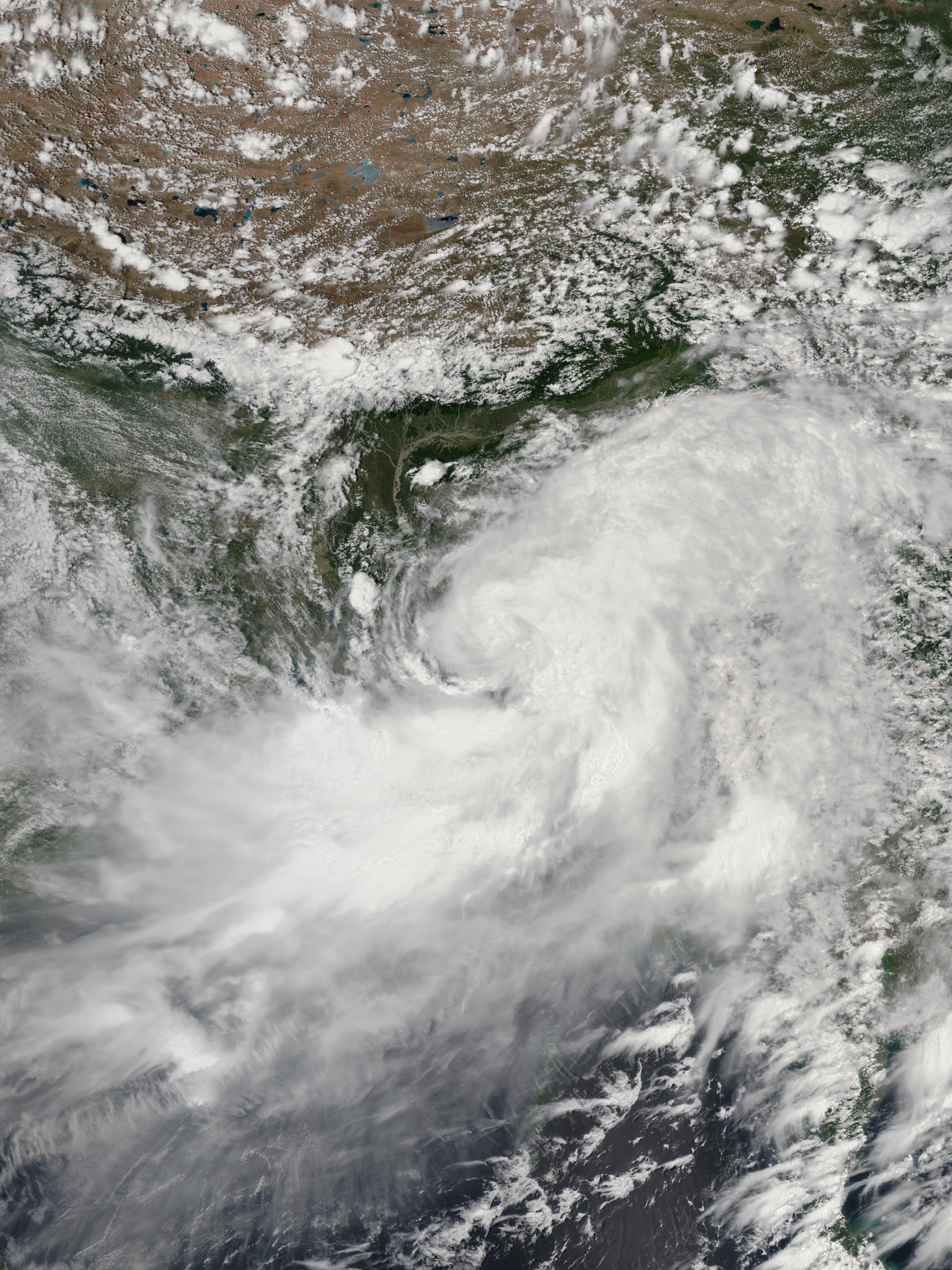
Cyclone Komen just off the Bangladeshi coast, July 2015

Beginning on 16 July 2015, unusually heavy monsoon rain fell on Myanmar, causing rivers and creeks to overflow, flooding low-lying areas along the waterways. By August, the flooding was the worst to affect the country for decades. In addition to the higher-than-average rainfall, mismanagement of irrigation projects and deforestation caused by logging have been cited by U Win Myo Thu, head of environmental organization EcoDev, as contributing to the flooding. Cyclone Komen, which struck in late July, also made the situation worse.

== Affected areas ==
=== Sagaing Division ===
In Sagaing Division, more than 190,000 acres (77,000 hectares) of farmlands are flooded and 18,000 acres (7,300 hectares) were destroyed. Kalay Township was severely affected by flooding; news reports showed the welcome signboard of the town completely submerged underwater. Kantbalu was also severely affected.

=== Magway Division ===
Overspills of Mone and Man creek affected 300 villages as well as town area in Pwintbyu, Sidoktaya and Ngape. Sinbyugyun, a city in Magway Division, was not affected by the flood.

== Relief efforts ==
The government has been accused of responding slowly to the crisis. However, unlike in 2008 during Cyclone Nargis when it refused outside help, this time around the government has sought international aid. The United Nations pledged $9m (£6m) in assistance. The UN's World Food Programme has delivered aid to 82,000 people in the worst hit parts of western Myanmar.

== See also ==
- 2022 Pyin Oo Lwin flood
- List of floods
- 2015 North Indian Ocean cyclone season
- Harda twin train derailment
- 2013 Somalia cyclone
- 2012 Nigeria floods
- Cyclone Komen
