= 2022 Pyin Oo Lwin flood =

Flood in Myanmar

A flood occurred in the city of Pyin Oo Lwin of Mandalay Region on 31 July 2022. It was the biggest flood in the township in the past 30 years with rainfall of 10.47 inches in eight hours.

The flood was caused by increase in flow in Gelaung Creek due to a torrential rainfall in the Mandalay Region from 2 am of 31 July up to the next day. The flood caused collapse of building and bridges. The flood affected people were rescued by police force, fire brigade and local volunteers. The lower part of the auxiliary spillway of Doe Kwin dam was also damaged. Residents and government security forces collectively took part in rescue and cleaning operation after the flood.

== See also ==
- 2015 Myanmar floods
