= Kamayani Express =

Train in India

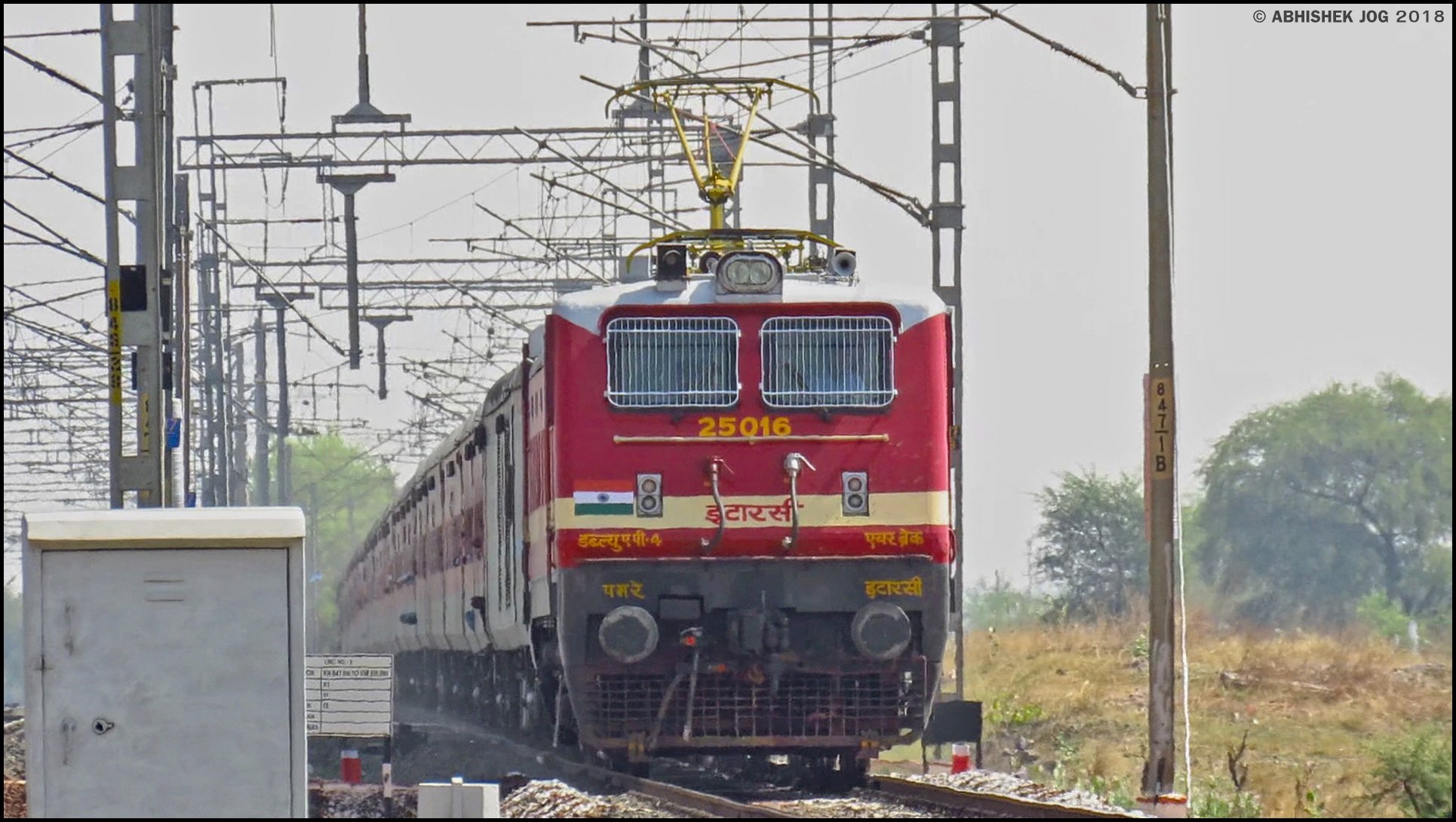
- 11072 Kamayani Express with LHB coach powered by Itarsi (ET) based WAP-4

Overview
- Service type: Express
- Locale: Maharashtra, Madhya Pradesh, Uttar Pradesh
- Current operator: Central Railways

Route
- Termini: Mumbai Lokmanya Tilak Terminus; Ballia
- Stops: 47
- Distance travelled: 1,786 km (1,110 mi)
- Average journey time: 29 hours 40 minutes
- Service frequency: Daily
- Train number: 11071/11072

On-board services
- Classes: Second AC, Third AC, Sleeper and Unreserved
- Seating arrangements: Yes
- Sleeping arrangements: Yes
- Catering facilities: Yes
- Observation facilities: LHB coach

Technical
- Track gauge: 5 ft 6 in (1,676 mm) broad gauge
- Operating speed: 53 km/h (33 mph) average with halts

Kamayani Express (Train No. 11071/11072) is a daily Express train run by Indian Railways between Mumbai Lokmanya Tilak Terminus and Ballia. It is the only train of Central Railways that runs from Mumbai to Ballia via Bhopal. Kamayani Express coaches are converted from ICF coach to new LHB coach.

On 4 August 2015, this train was involved in this Harda twin train derailment in Madhya Pradesh.

== Service and schedule ==
The train starts daily from Mumbai Lokmanya Tilak terminus station and from Ballia, covering the total distance of 1,786 kilometres (1,110 mi) in approximately 29 hours 40 minutes.

== Route and stations ==
This train passes through 47 intermediate stations including Thane, Nashik Road, Bhusaval Junction, Raver, Bhopal Junction,Bina Junction and Prayagraj Junction.

== Coach and rake ==
Kamayani Express has no rake-sharing arrangement with any other trains. Earlier they run by WCAM-3, The train is pulled by WAP-7 and WAP-4 from Mumbai Lokmanya Tilak Terminus to Banaras and vice versa. The train has 11 sleeper, 4 Third AC,1 Second AC,1 First AC conditioned and 2 general class coaches.

== Accident ==
On 4 August 2015, the Kamayani Express and the Rajendra Nagar–Lokmanya Tilak Terminus Janta Express overturn at the same spot in Madhya Pradesh. The accident happened around midnight at bridge number 648/1 on the Machan River, where the water level was high because of heavy rainfall. As per the officer, six coaches of the Kamayani Express and three coaches along with the engine of the Janata Express were derailed. After cutting off the derailed coaches, the Kamayani Express was taken to the nearest station, Bhirangi railway station. More than 300 Kamayani Express passengers were rescued after the accident, but approximately 25 people died and more than 50 were injured.

The Prime Minister Narendra Modi and Railway PRO announced that the deceased families would receive around ₹2 lakh as ex gratia, and those who were injured badly would receive around ₹50000 from the Central Government. Victims with minor injuries would also get ₹25000.
