= Cyclone Komen =

North Indian cyclone in 2015

Cyclonic Storm Komen
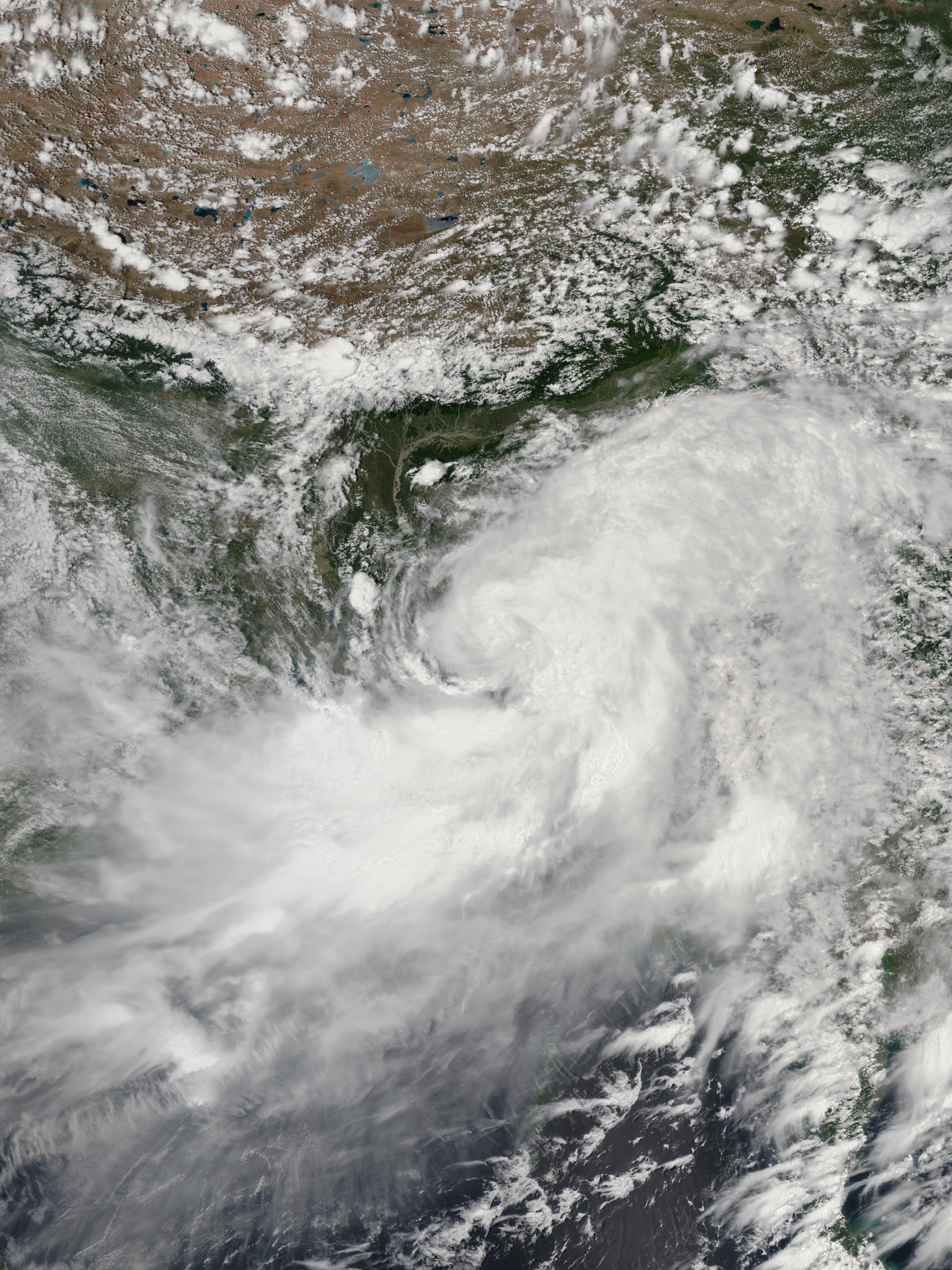
- Komen approaching the Bangladesh coast on July 30

Meteorological history
- Formed: July 26, 2015
- Dissipated: August 2, 2015

Cyclonic storm
- 3-minute sustained (IMD)
- Highest winds: 75 km/h (45 mph)
- Lowest pressure: 986 hPa (mbar); 29.12 inHg

Overall effects
- Fatalities: 167–260 (including unrelated flooding)
- Damage: $2.06 billion (2015 USD)
- Areas affected: Myanmar, Bangladesh, India
- IBTrACS
- Part of the 2015 North Indian Ocean cyclone season

Cyclonic Storm Komen (Note: The name Komen (Thai: โกเมน, [koː˧ meːn˧]) was contributed by Thailand and means "garnet" in Thai.) was an unusual tropical cyclone that originated near the southern coast of Bangladesh and later struck the same country while drifting over the northern Bay of Bengal. The second named storm of the 2015 season, Komen brought several days of heavy rainfall to Myanmar, Bangladesh, and India. It formed as a depression on July 26 over the Ganges delta and moved in a circular motion around the northern Bay of Bengal. Komen intensified into a 75 km/h (45 mph) cyclonic storm and moved ashore southeastern Bangladesh on July 30. The system turned westward over land and was last noted over eastern India on August 2.

Across its path, Komen dropped torrential rainfall, primarily in northwestern Myanmar where the precipitation totaled at 840 mm (33 in) in Paletwa. The rains compounded ongoing flooding and contributed to the worst flooding in the country in a century. About 1.7 million people were forced to evacuate as flood waters inundated houses to their rooftops. About 510,000 houses in the country were damaged or destroyed, and many residents lost their source of income as 667,221 acres (270,015 hectares) of crop fields were damaged. The floods killed 132 people, with at least 39 fatalities directly related to Komen. The government requested assistance from the international community to cope with the disaster, considered the worst in the country since Cyclone Nargis in 2008. Elsewhere, the storm's flooding damaged 88,900 houses in Bangladesh and covered crop fields for a week; Komen killed 45 people in the country, some of them due to illnesses spread following the storm. Later, floodwaters affected southeastern India, killing 103 people and damaging or destroying 476,046 houses.

== Meteorological history ==
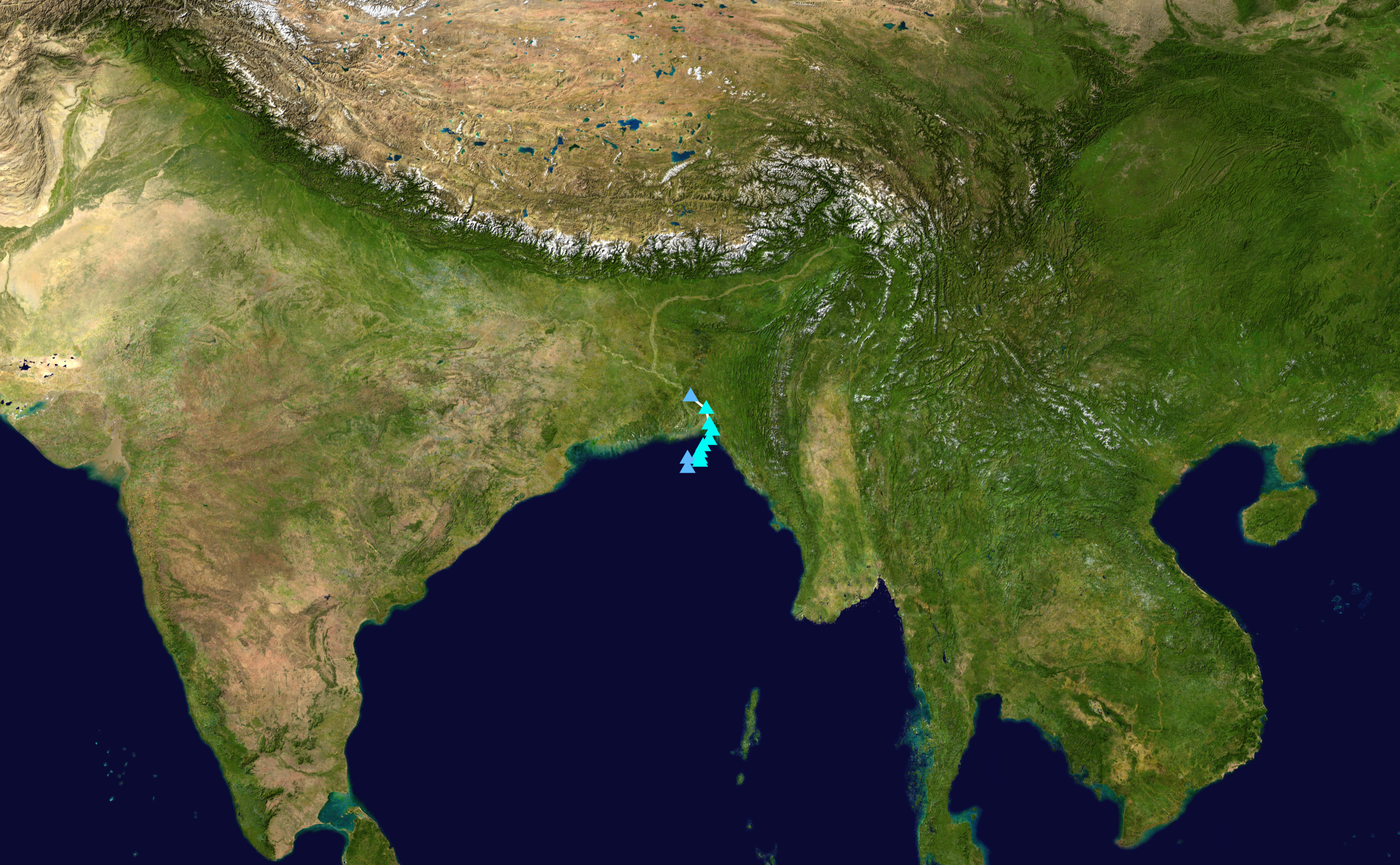
Map plotting the storm's track and intensity, according to the Saffir–Simpson scale Map key Saffir–Simpson scale Tropical depression (≤38 mph, ≤62 km/h) Tropical storm (39–73 mph, 63–118 km/h) Category 1 (74–95 mph, 119–153 km/h) Category 2 (96–110 mph, 154–177 km/h) Category 3 (111–129 mph, 178–208 km/h) Category 4 (130–156 mph, 209–251 km/h) Category 5 (≥157 mph, ≥252 km/h) Unknown Storm type Tropical cyclone Subtropical cyclone Extratropical cyclone, remnant low, tropical disturbance, or monsoon depression

The monsoon spawned a low-pressure area on July 25 over the extreme northern Bay of Bengal and along the southern coast of Bangladesh. With low wind shear and abundant convection south of a developing circulation, the system quickly organized. At 03:00 UTC on July 26, the India Meteorological Department (IMD) classified the system as a depression, while the circulation was nearly stationary near the southern coast of Bangladesh. Land interaction and an unfavorable phase of the Madden–Julian oscillation prevented further strengthening, despite warm water temperatures of 31 °C (88 °F). Early on July 27, the American-based Joint Typhoon Warning Center (JTWC) began monitoring the depression after the convection organized further, amplified by good outflow. Still embedded within the monsoon, the depression remained nearly stationary for two days over southern Bangladesh. The JTWC issued a Tropical Cyclone Formation Alert late on July 28, due to the increasingly defined circulation.

On July 28, the system began moving more to the south and southeast, although its movement was very slow, possibly affected by another monsoon depression over western India. The IMD described the track as "unique", taking a "semi-circular path over the northeast Bay of Bengal." At 00:00 UTC on the next day, the IMD upgraded the depression to a deep depression, and three hours later the JTWC classified the system as Tropical Cyclone 02B, located 135 km (84 mi) southwest of Chittagong, Bangladesh. A tropical upper tropospheric trough to the northeast imparted dry air, but otherwise, conditions were generally favorable. A ridge over Myanmar turned the system to the north on July 29. During that day, the circulation was somewhat elongated and exposed from the convection, while the thunderstorms in the southern periphery organized into spiral rainbands. At 18:00 UTC on July 29, the IMD upgraded the system to Cyclonic Storm Komen, one of only four storms of such intensity in July since 1965; typically, low-pressure areas that form in the month are in the extreme northern periphery of the Bay of Bengal, allowing little time to develop over waters, and usually impeded by wind shear.

Late on July 29, the JTWC estimated that Komen attained peak 1 minute sustained winds of 75 km/h (45 mph), based on estimates from satellite imagery. As the storm approached Bangladesh, the circulation remained very broad with most of the convection in the southern periphery, although radar imagery from the coast indicated there was a formative eye feature in the storm's center. At 06:00 UTC on July 30, the IMD estimated peak 3 minute winds of 75 km/h (45 mph). Between 14:00–15:00 UTC that day, Komen made landfall on Bangladesh just west of Chittagong, and the JTWC discontinued advisories once the storm was ashore. Komen quickly weakened as it turned to the northwest through Bangladesh, steered by a ridge over Tibet to the north. On July 31, the system crossed into the Indian state of West Bengal as a weakened depression. The track shifted to the west-southwest until Komen weakened into a remnant low on August 2 over Jharkhand.

== Preparations ==
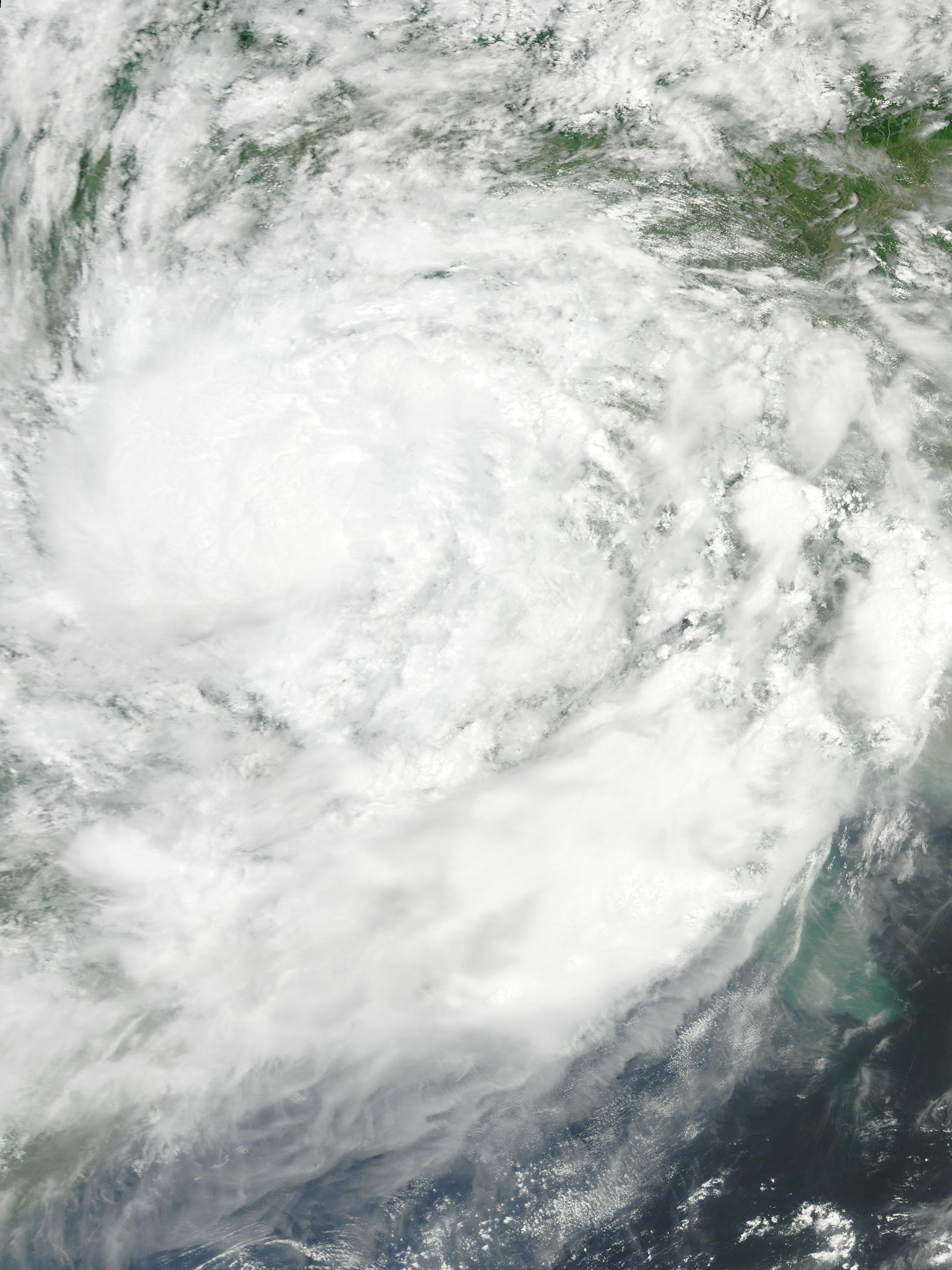
Komen over land on August 2

During the duration of Komen's existence, the IMD issued warnings on the storm that were relayed to the governments of the countries affected. In southeastern India, government officials issued various warnings for fishermen and for the potential of disruptive rainfall. The widespread flooding forced 1.2 million people to evacuate their homes, with 1,537 shelters opened to house 214,306 of the evacuees. West Bengal Chief Minister Mamata Banerjee canceled an overseas trip to London to coordinate relief activities related to the storm.

The Bangladeshi government evacuated 331,120 people to 766 storm shelters, mostly in low-lying areas of Cox's Bazar District.

== Impact ==
For several days, Komen dropped heavy rainfall across the northern Bay of Bengal and onto the adjacent coastlines of northwestern Myanmar, Bangladesh, and eastern India. The southeast quadrant produced the heavy rainfall, resulting in a peak rainfall of 840 mm (33 in) in Paletwa, Myanmar; the country experienced record rainfall totals during July and August 2015 in some locations.

=== Bangladesh ===
Moving ashore Bangladesh, Komen was accompanied by a storm surge of 1 to 2 m (3.3 to 6.6 ft) that affected Chittagong, while flooding rains caused landslides.gladesh, a station at Teknaf Upazila briefly recorded winds of 100 km/h (60 mph) on July 30. Chittagong in southeastern Bangladesh recorded over 800 mm (31 in) of rainfall over three days, and over 1,000 mm (39 in) in Cox's Bazar over ten days. Rough seas killed two people off Cox's Bazar when a boat capsized. Rain-induced landslides killed five people in Cox's Bazar, and two others died in the town due to flooding. The storm damaged 88,900 houses across Bangladesh, including hundreds of fishermen huts. Trees knocked onto houses killed at least three people in separate instances. Flooding submerged at least 145,000 ha (360,000 acres) of crops for at least a week after Komen struck the country. Komen killed 45 people in Bangladesh – 21 in Cox's Bazar and 7 in Bandarban District – some of whom due to illnesses spread by the storm. About 220,000 residencies required some form of assistance after the storm, primarily to cover lack of food. Damage in Chittagong exceeds ৳1.41 billion (US$18.1 million).

=== India ===
India, rainfall peaked at 520 mm (20 in) in Harinkhola, West Bengal, after the storm moved inland and tracked westward. Komen's rainfall in India compounded upon previous floods; heavy rainfall from the storm occurred while rivers and dams were overflowing. Rainfall produced a landslide in Manipur state in extreme eastern India, killing 20 people. As the storm moved into West Bengal, it killed 10,088 livestock while affecting millions of residents. Komen damaged 368,238 houses and destroyed another 107,808. Across the state, the storm killed 83 people, some related to lightning and snakebites. Flooding covered a portion of National Highway 60 in neighboring Odisha state. The Indian government utilized 121 rescue boats to assist stranded residents. Overall damage in West Bengal were up to ₹30 billion (US$467 million).

=== Myanmar ===
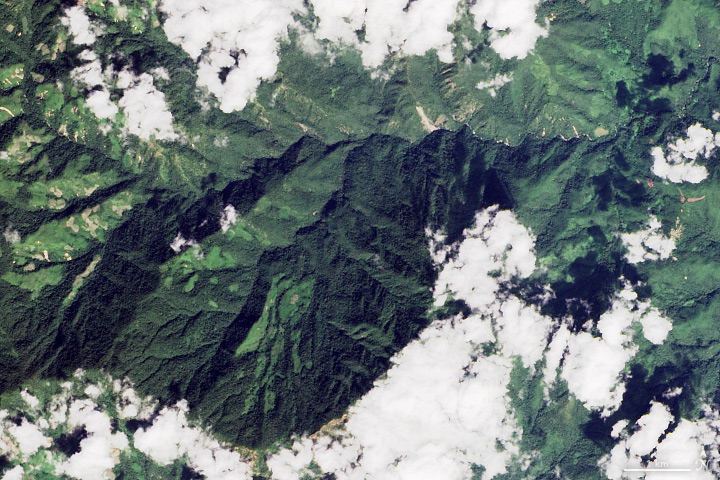
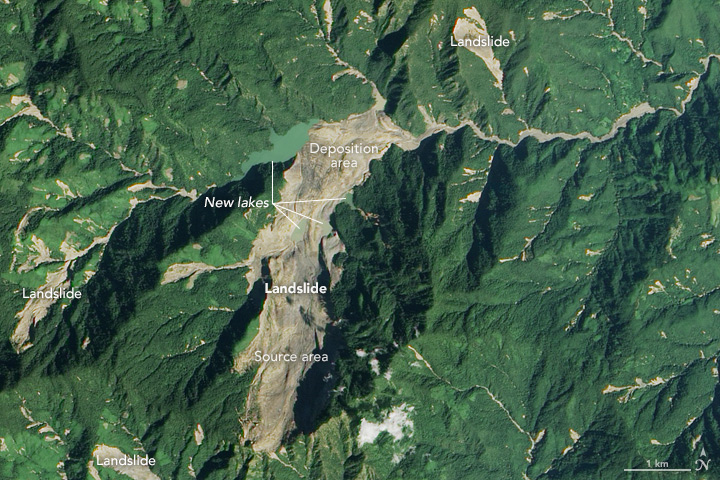
Before and after image of a landslide in Chin State

Across northwestern Myanmar, Komen brought additional rainfall after weeks of monsoonal flooding. In extreme northwestern Myanmar, Maungdaw recorded winds of 124 km/h (77 mph), possibly during a passing squall. Nearby Sittwe recorded winds of 107 km/h (66 mph). Torrential rainfall, reaching 150 mm (5.9 in) per hour, caused flooding and landslides. In Chin State northeast of Tonzang, Komen resulted in three landslides, including one along a mountain slope that moved 395 million tons of ground at a speed of up to 180 km/h (110 mph); the landslide was 5.9 km (3.7 mi) in length, one of the largest worldwide in a decade that was unrelated to an earthquake, and a much faster moving landslide than normal. The flooding after Komen's passage were considered the worst disaster in Myanmar since Cyclone Nargis in 2008, and according to the government, possibly the worst flooding in a century. About 1.7 million people had to temporarily evacuate.

Water levels reached the top of buildings, which displaced residents and restricted travel to just by boat and helicopter. Floods from Komen caused further damage to houses and roads. The floods covered crop fields with mud and silt, particularly in valleys. By the end of July 2015, over 1,400,000 acres (570,000 ha) of farmlands were inundated, of which 667,221 acres (270,015 hectares) of planted crops were damaged, mainly to the rice paddy. About 236,000 chickens were killed, and there were lower losses to other livestock. In Sittwe, flooding and winds damaged six shelters and camps, where about 100,000 people were residing during the storm. The shelters sustained damage to latrines and learning centers, necessitating the use of tarps to ride out the floods. The town of Kalay was isolated by floods and only reachable by air travel.

Flooding from Komen was worst in Rakhine State, where water distribution was contaminated, and entire towns were largely destroyed. Waters started to recede by August 4, allowing residents to return home; by September 2015, most of the displaced residents nationwide had returned home. High winds in Lailenpi within Chin State damaged a school and a training center for community health workers. Four schools were damaged nationwide by Komen alone. The storm and the preceding floods damaged 490,000 houses and destroyed another 21,000, causing 132 deaths, at least 55 of whom in Rakhine State. Komen was directly responsible for at least 39 deaths in the country. Total estimated loss of the flooding were at K1.942 trillion (US$1.57 billion).

== Aftermath ==
On July 31, President of Myanmar Thein Sein declared disaster areas for Chin and Rakhine states and for Sagaing and Magway regions. On August 4, the government issued an appeal to the international community for assistance. In response, the government of Australia provided A$3 million (US$2.19 million), and the United States Agency for International Development sent US$600,000. Neighboring Bangladesh donated $800,000 worth of medicine, water kits, and other supplies. Assistance from other countries included $775,000 from the United Kingdom, $142,202 from nearby Thailand, $100,000 from the Singapore Red Cross, and $300,000 from China.

After Myanmar's government failed to respond to the devastating effects of Cyclone Nargis in 2008, officials responded more quickly to the floods and the effects from Komen. Relief supplies were airdropped to marooned villages, assisting the Rohingya people in Rakhine. The government allocated US$1.2 million toward supplying farmers with rice paddy seeds to regrow damaged crops. About half of the damaged crop was replanted by November 2015, and in most areas, the grounds remained fertile for future growing. Local businesses donated K2.06 billion toward buying supplies, and businessman Aung Ko Win donated US$3.6 million. The Myanmar Red Cross, which was already responding to the ongoing flooding, provided additional supplies and assisted with evacuations. The International Federation of Red Cross and Red Crescent Societies assisted in these efforts by providing rice and blankets. Volunteers distributed sleeping mats, mosquito nets, medical supplies, and tarps. Various United Nations agencies assisted the residents in displaced camps that were affected further by Komen. Within a month of the storm, the World Food Programme had provided meals to over 450,000 people. Food and oil prices rose in the weeks after the floods, and the price of rice reached record levels in the country in August and September 2015. The cost gradually declined after the next rice harvest. To help unemployed farm workers, the Bill & Melinda Gates Foundation financed a program to pay storm victims to rebuild damaged embankments and restore clean water access. An assessment by the United Nations, the World Bank, and the Myanmar government found that women and children were the worst affected group during and after the disaster, due to the stresses of the damaged houses, and insufficient food and assistance in the subsequent months.

== See also ==
- 2004 Myanmar cyclone – powerful and damaging storm that struck northwestern Myanmar
- Cyclone Akash – affected Myanmar and Bangladesh in May 2007.
- Cyclone Sidr – a tropical cyclone in November 2007 that resulted in one of the worst natural disasters in Bangladesh.
- Cyclone Yemyin – slow-moving storm in June 2007 that caused damaging floods across India and Pakistan
- Cyclone Nargis – powerful and the costliest storm in the Indian Ocean in April/May 2008
- Cyclone Mora – a strong tropical cyclone in May 2017 that resulted in one of the worst floods in Bangladesh, Sri Lanka and India
- Cyclone Aila – a tropical cyclone in May 2009 which devastated Bangladesh and west Bengal
