= 2015 North Indian Ocean cyclone season =

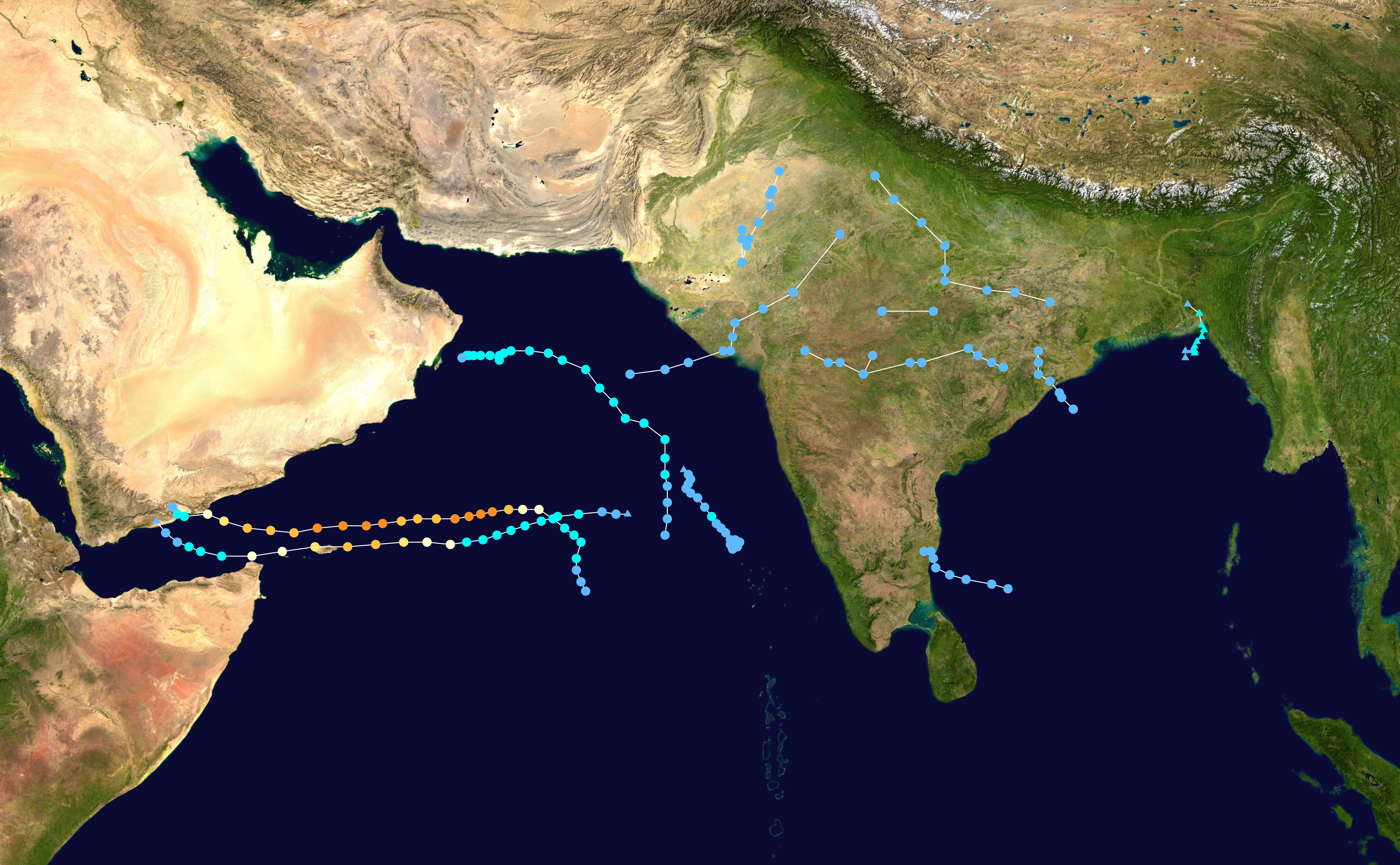
- Season summary map

Seasonal boundaries
- First system formed: June 7, 2015
- Last system dissipated: November 10, 2015

Strongest storm
- Name: Chapala
  - Maximum winds: 215 km/h (130 mph) (3-minute sustained)
  - Lowest pressure: 940 hPa (mbar)

Seasonal statistics
- Depressions: 12
- Deep depressions: 9
- Cyclonic storms: 4
- Severe cyclonic storms: 2
- Very severe cyclonic storms: 2
- Extremely severe cyclonic storms: 2
- Super cyclonic storms: 0
- Total fatalities: 453 total
- Total damage: > $2.42 billion (2015 USD)

Related articles
- Timeline of the 2015 North Indian Ocean cyclone season; 2015 Atlantic hurricane season; 2015 Pacific hurricane season; 2015 Pacific typhoon season

The 2015 North Indian Ocean cyclone season was an event in the annual cycle of tropical cyclone formation. It was an average season with 4 cyclonic storms. The North Indian Ocean cyclone season has no official bounds, but cyclones tend to form between April and December, with the peak from May to November. These dates conventionally delimit the period of each year when most tropical cyclones form in the northern Indian Ocean.

The scope of this article is limited to the Indian Ocean in the Northern Hemisphere, east of the Horn of Africa and west of the Malay Peninsula. There are two main seas in the North Indian Ocean — the Arabian Sea to the west of the Indian subcontinent, abbreviated ARB by the India Meteorological Department (IMD); and the Bay of Bengal to the east, abbreviated BOB by the IMD. The systems that form over land are abbreviated as LAND.

The official Regional Specialized Meteorological Centre in this basin is the IMD, while the Joint Typhoon Warning Center releases unofficial advisories. On average, three to four cyclonic storms form in this basin every season.

== Season summary ==
The season started rather late compared to the last two years, with the first storm, Ashobaa, not developing until June 7. Ashobaa was followed by 2 depressions, before Komen formed in July. Komen produced torrential rainfall in Bangladesh. September featured no storms, before Chapala formed at the end of October. Chapala rapidly intensified over the Arabian Sea into an Extremely Severe Cyclonic Storm, becoming the strongest in the Arabian Sea since Gonu in 2007. Chapala also became the only hurricane-force system to make landfall in Yemen, and the first since 1922 in Socotra. Chapala was followed by Megh, which reached a weaker intensity in the same general area.

== Systems ==
=== Cyclonic Storm Ashobaa ===
- Cyclonic storm (IMD)
- Tropical storm (SSHWS)
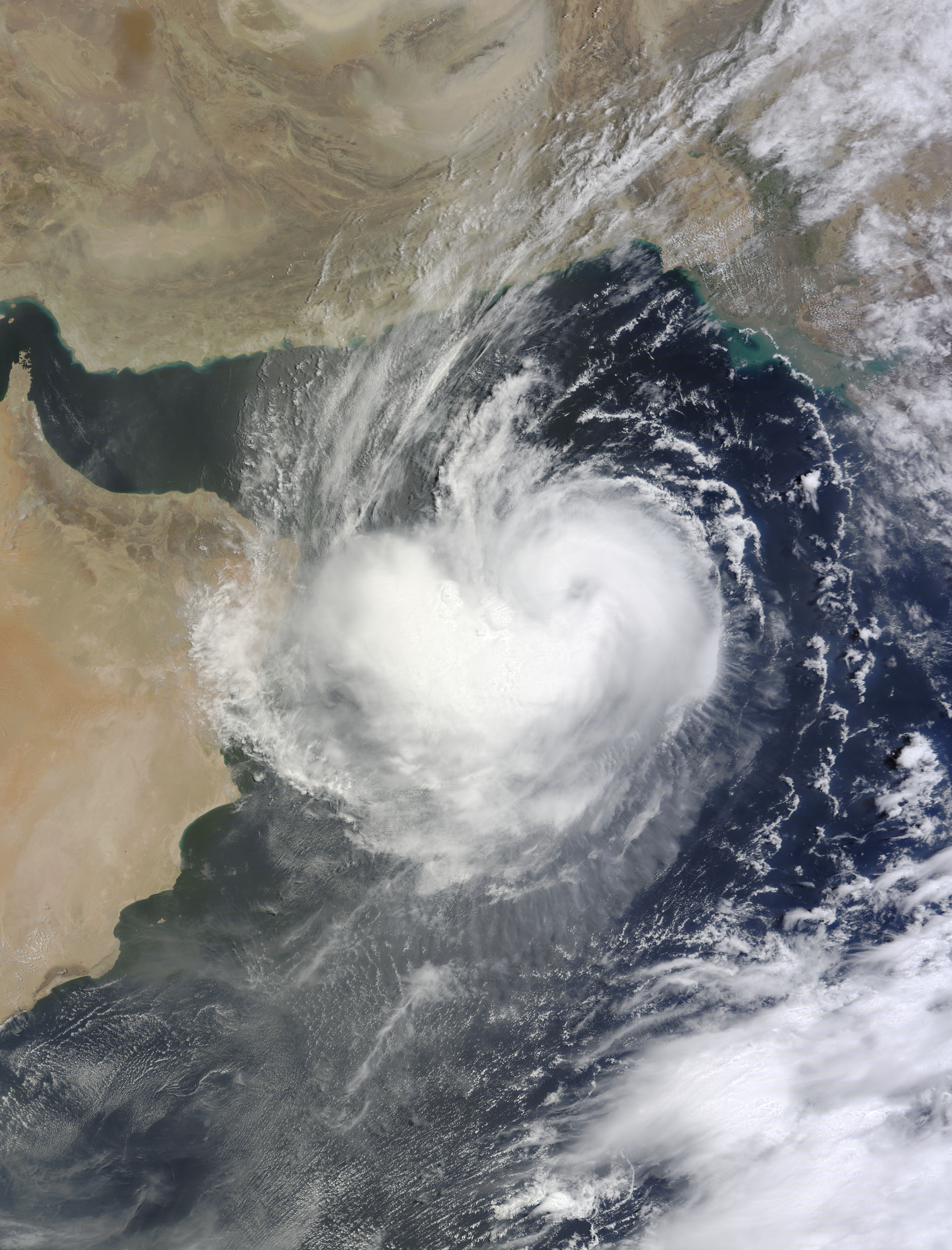
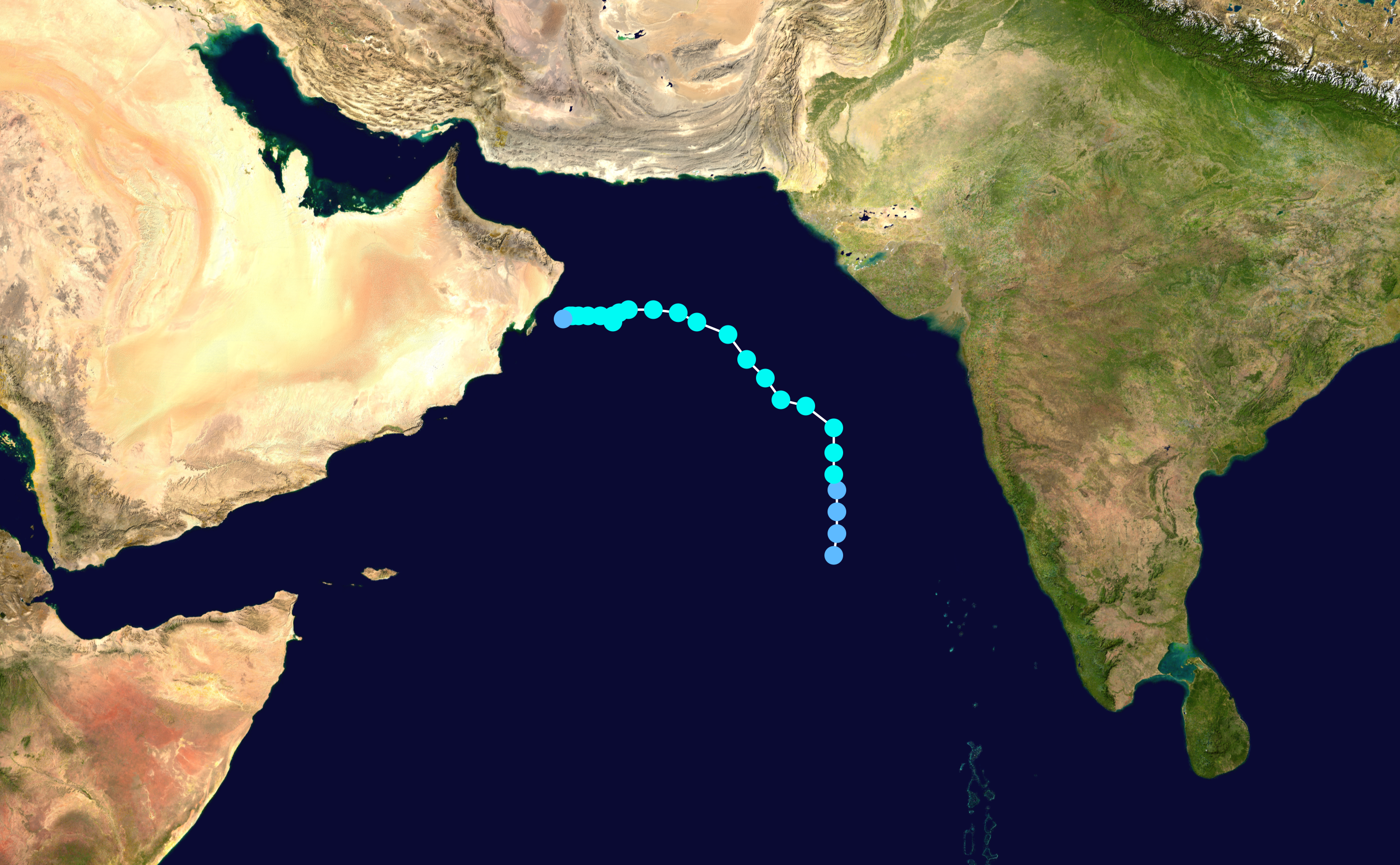
- Duration: June 7 – June 12
- Peak intensity: 85 km/h (50 mph) (3-min); 990 hPa (mbar)

Under the influence of an ongoing onset of a southwest monsoon, a low-pressure area formed on June 6. It slowly consolidated, prompting the Joint Typhoon Warning Center (JTWC) to issue a Tropical Cyclone Formation Alert (TCFA) on June 6. The following day, the India Meteorological Department (IMD) issued its first advisory for the system, designating it ARB 01. Later the same day, the JTWC reported the storm had reached tropical cyclone intensity, and on June 8, the IMD upgraded the storm to a cyclonic storm, assigning it the name Ashobaa. (Note: The name Ashobaa (Sinhala: අශෝභා, [aʃoːbaː]) was contributed by Sri Lanka and means "unbeauteousness, dimness, indecency" in Sinhala.) The storm continued to track northwestwards for a while, before turning westwards and weakening due to moderate to high wind shear and land interaction.

Due to most of the moisture being drawn into the storm, the onset of the southwest monsoon over the Indian subcontinent was stalled. Torrential rains fell across much of eastern Oman, with Masirah Island receiving 225 mm (8.9 in) of rain in one day and more than 250 mm (9.8 in) overall. Significant flooding prompted dozens of evacuations while strong winds caused power outages. Waterlogging was reported in Kalba and Fujairah, in the United Arab Emirates, due to disturbed weather attributed to Ashobaa.

=== Depression BOB 01 ===
- Depression (IMD)
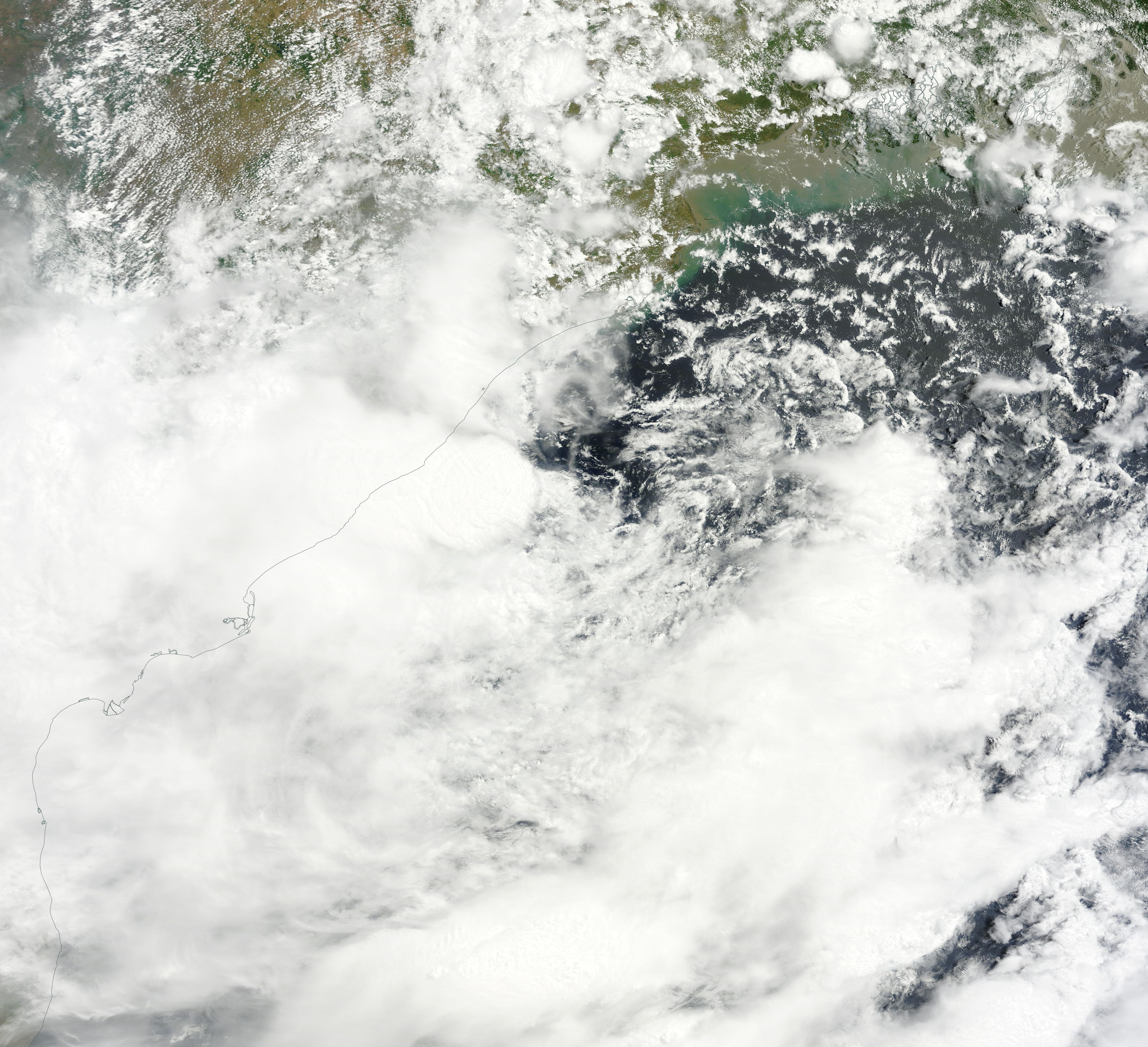
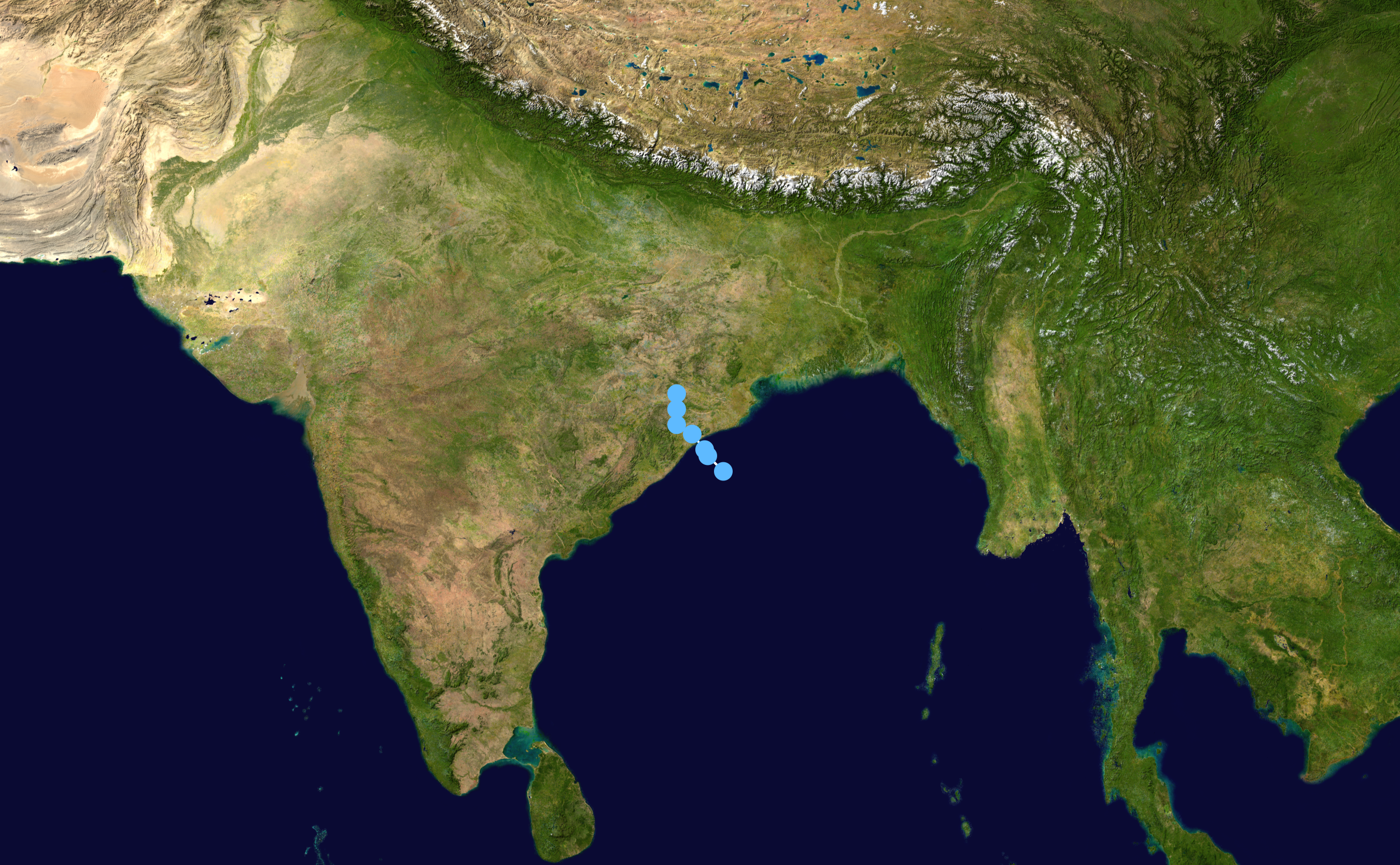
- Duration: June 20 – June 21
- Peak intensity: 45 km/h (30 mph) (3-min); 994 hPa (mbar)

An area of low pressure developed off the east coast of India on June 17, about 135 nmi (250 km; 155 mi) east-southeast of Visakhapatnam. Over the next two days, deep convection developed along the southern and western periphery of the centre of the system, predominantly under the influence of the advancing southwest monsoon. Due to the moderate-to-strong wind shear caused by the monsoon, the disturbance failed to develop any further, and the JTWC had reported that it dissipated on June 20. At the same time, however, the IMD started tracking this system as a depression, reporting gusts of up to 35 kn (65 km/h; 40 mph). The depression made landfall over Odisha coast early on June 21, between Gopalpur and Puri. Without any further information, the IMD stopped tracking BOB 01 on June 22.

Rough seas from the depression caught many fishing vessels off-guard, with at least 150 people reported missing offshore on June 21. The vast majority either returned to shore safely or were rescued within a day; however, nine fishermen are feared to have drowned. The entire state of Odisha was put on alert on June 21–23. The system brought heavy rains to most of the state, with Malkangiri receiving the highest, 320 mm (13 in) of rain. Access to many towns in the Malkangiri district was blocked due to flooding. At least six deaths took place from flood-related incidents.

=== Deep Depression ARB 02 ===
- Deep depression (IMD)
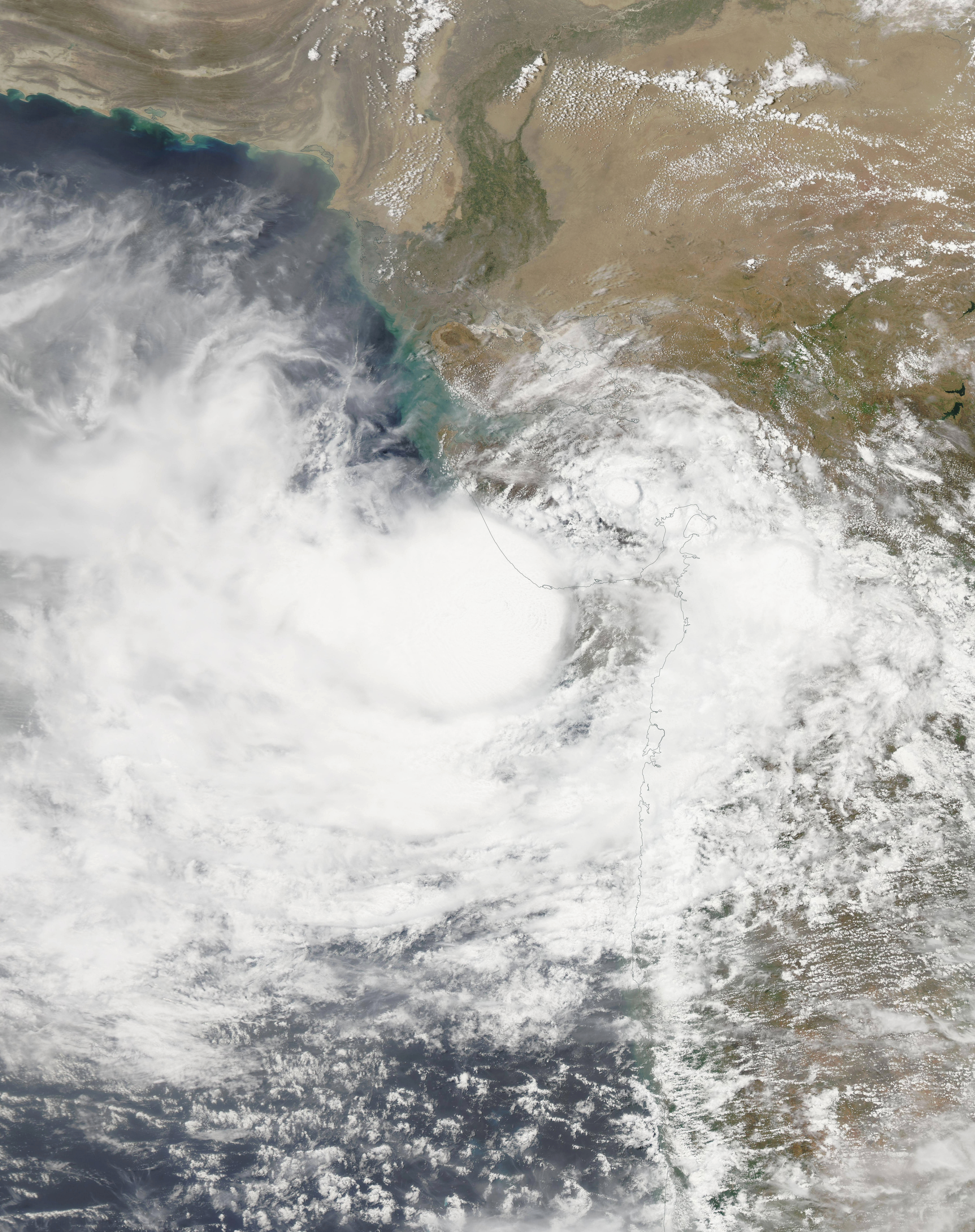
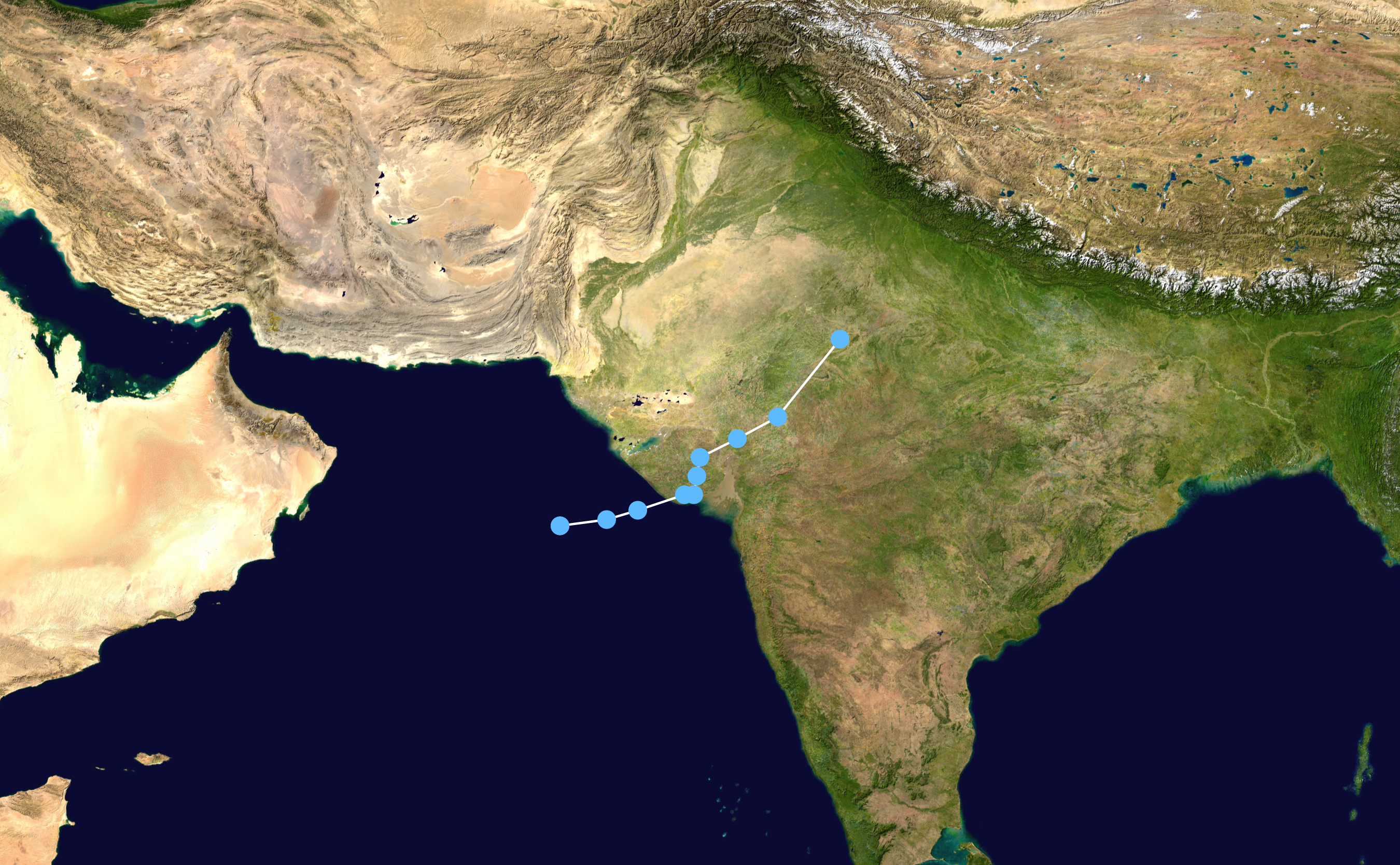
- Duration: June 22 – June 24
- Peak intensity: 55 km/h (35 mph) (3-min); 988 hPa (mbar)

Following the series of monsoonal disturbances, a fresh wave of thunderstorms organized into an area of low pressure on June 21, in the Arabian Sea, off the coast of Gujarat. Deep convection persisted to the west of the system while the circulation continued to develop over the next 24 hours, and the IMD started tracking it as a depression, with the identifier ARB 02. ARB 02 continued to evolve and by the night of June 22, the JTWC issued a TCFA on the system, while it was 285 nmi (528 km; 328 mi) west-northwest of Mumbai.

Torrential rains battered Gujarat, with peak accumulations of 636 mm (25.0 in) in Bagasara, 511 mm (20.1 in) in Dhari, and 400 mm (16 in) in Variyav. Severe flooding ensued across the region, isolating many villages in the Saurashtra region, and prompted mobilization of the National Disaster Response Force and Indian Air Force. Flooding in the Amreli district was reported to be the worst in 90 years; 600 of the district's 838 villages were affected, 400 of which were rendered inaccessible by land. At least 80 people died in the region, with Saurashtra suffering the greatest losses. Ten Asiatic lions, an endangered species with only 523 living individuals documented in May 2015, died during the floods while more than a dozen remain missing. The Gujarat government estimated damage at ₹16.5 billion (US$258 million); however, Congress MLA Paresh Dhanani claimed damage to be as high as ₹70 billion (US$1.09 billion).

=== Depression LAND 01 ===
- Depression (IMD)
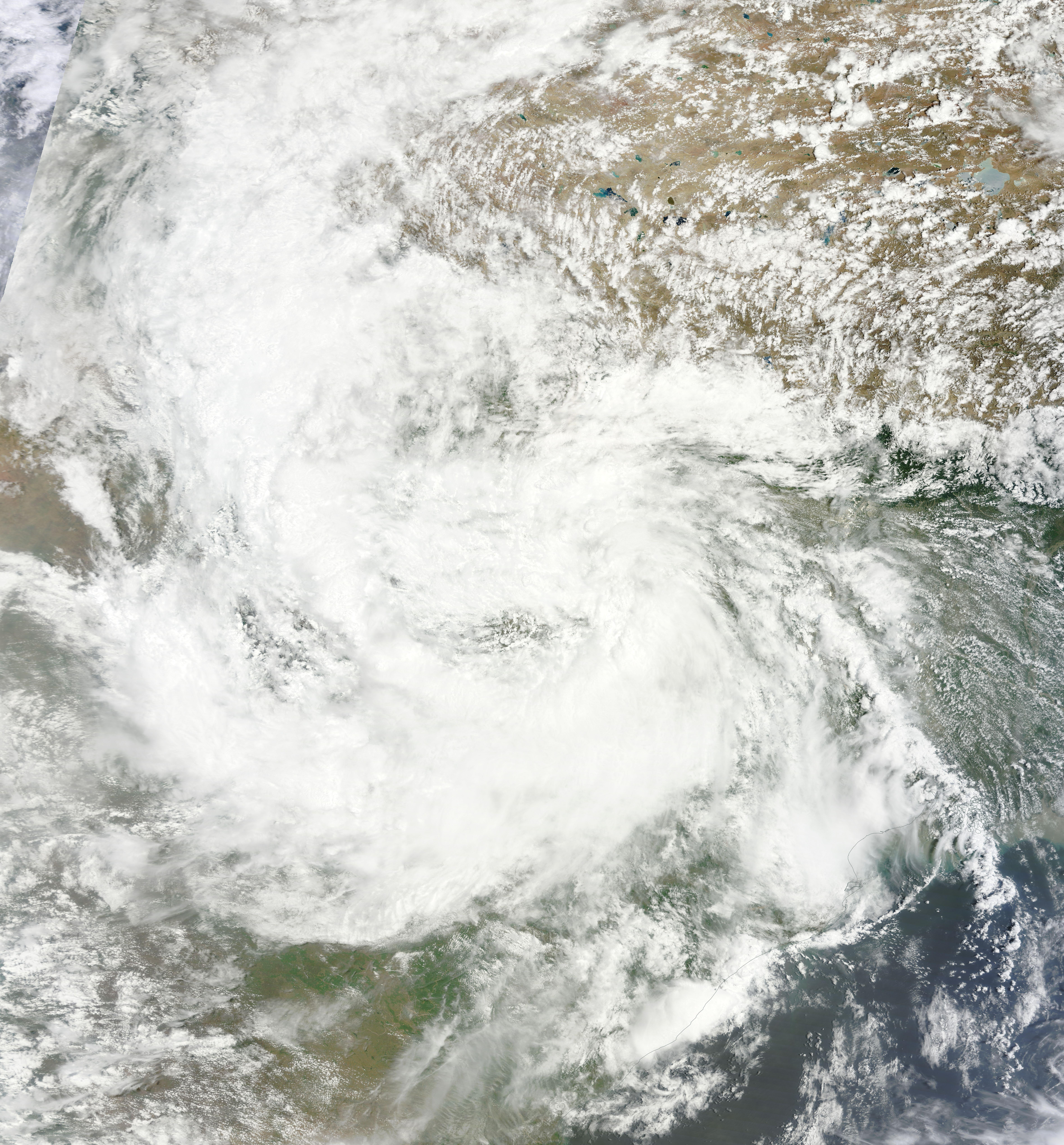
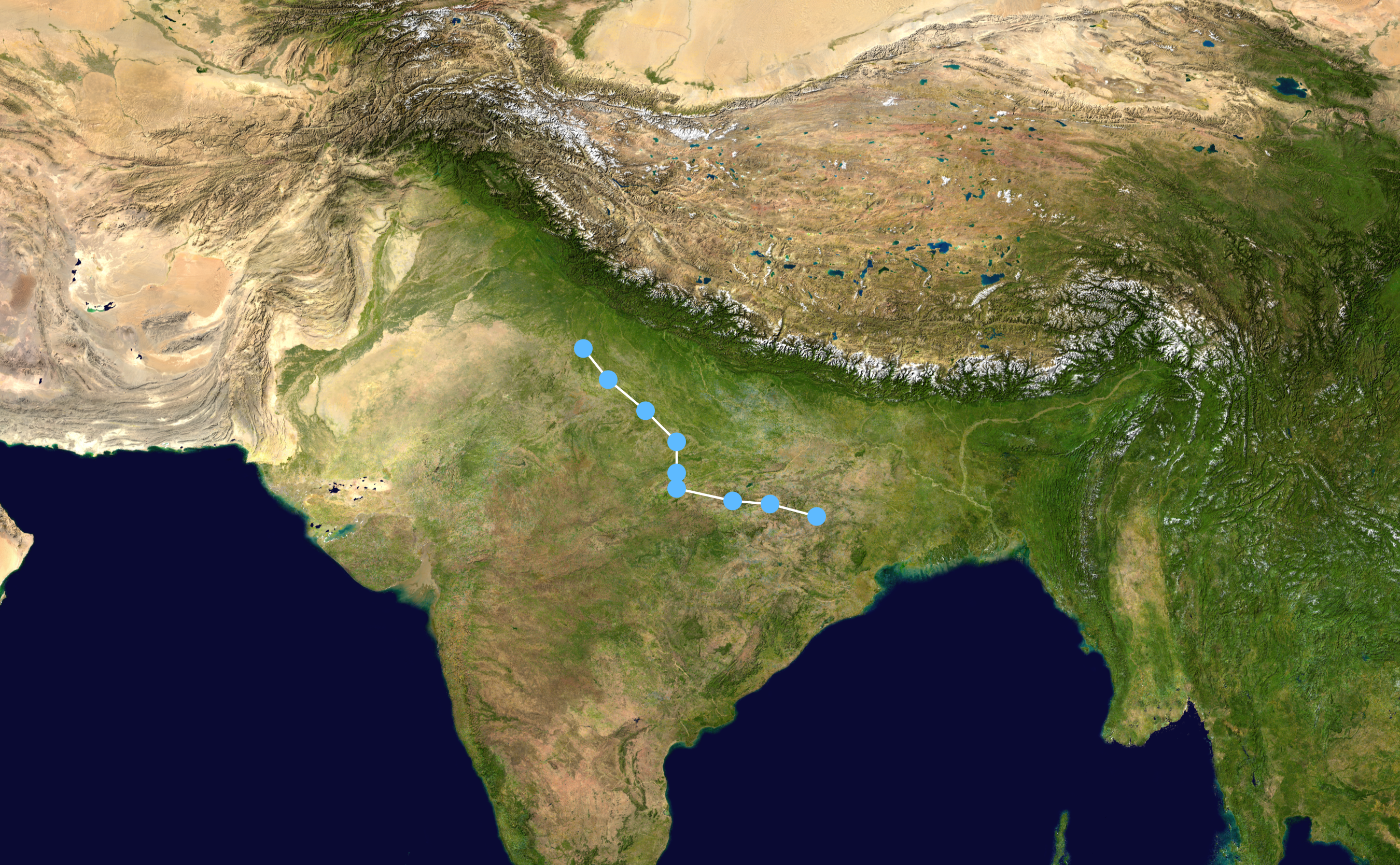
- Duration: July 10 – July 12
- Peak intensity: 45 km/h (30 mph) (3-min); 994 hPa (mbar)

At 03:00 UTC (08:30 AM IST) on July 10, a depression formed over land over Jharkhand, close to Ranchi. It drifted in a generally northwestward direction and dissipated early on July 12 over the periphery of Uttar Pradesh and adjoining areas of Haryana.

The system produced extremely heavy downpours, breaking the record in the city of Gwalior, Madhya Pradesh for the maximum amount of rainfall in 24 hours. The city received 191 mm (8 in) of rainfall in a day breaking the previous record of 149.9 mm (6 in) which was set around the same period in 1947. The rainfall received was also more than 75% of the average monthly rainfall of 250.7 mm (10 in) in the city. In Odisha, at least 14 villages were inundated by floods directly linked to the depression. The Hirakud Dam authorities had announced that they would be releasing waters on July 13 from the river Mahanadi. The states of Uttar Pradesh and Haryana also received torrential rains from the system.

=== Cyclonic Storm Komen ===
- Cyclonic storm (IMD)
- Monsoon depression
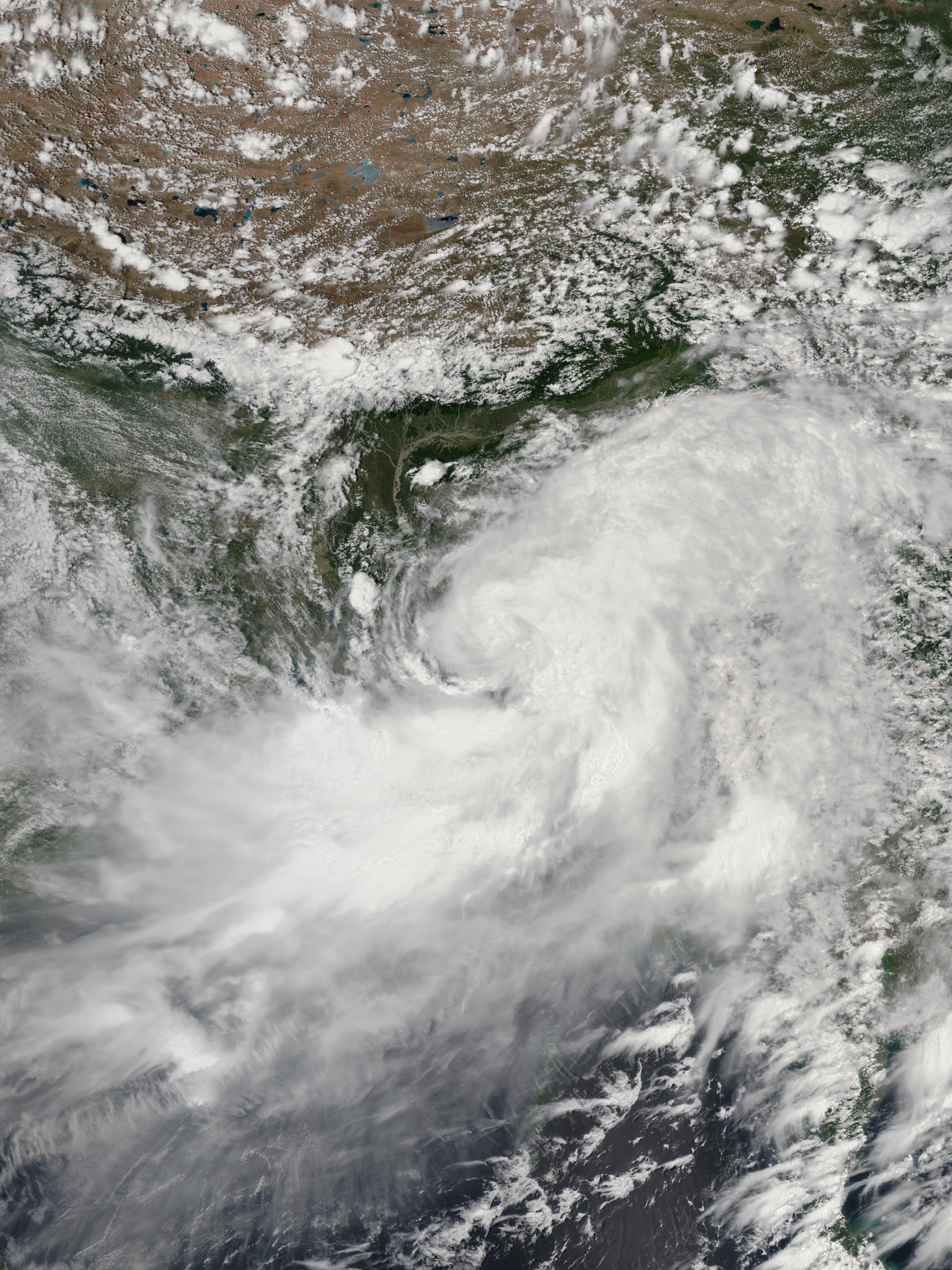
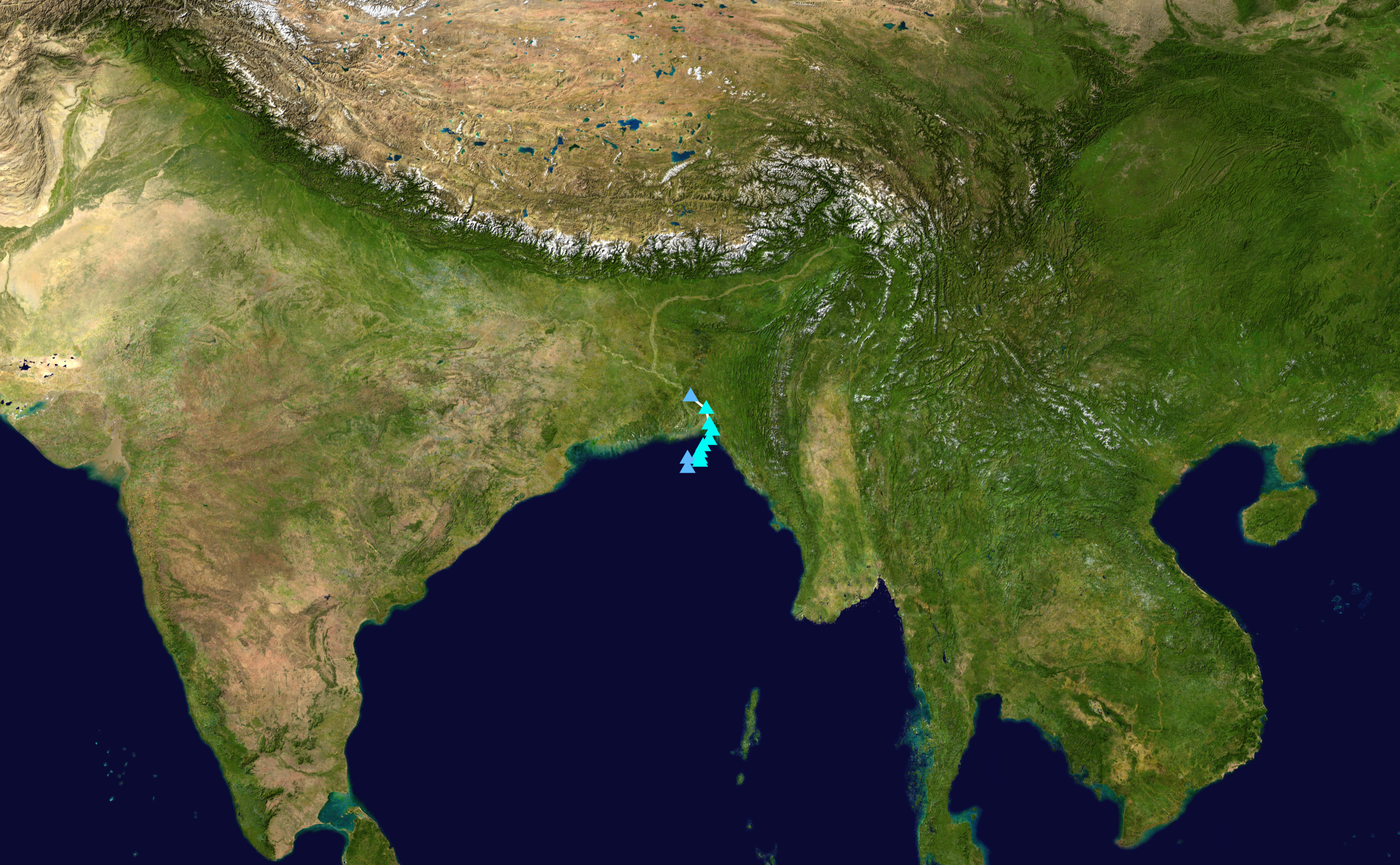
- Duration: July 26 – August 2
- Peak intensity: 75 km/h (45 mph) (3-min); 986 hPa (mbar)

On July 26 a depression formed inland over the Ganges delta. Early on July 30, the system was upgraded to a cyclonic storm by the IMD and named as Komen while making a U-turn. (Note: The name Komen (Thai: โกเมน, [koː˧ meːn˧]) was contributed by Thailand and means "garnet" in Thai.) On August 2, Komen was no longer a tropical cyclone.

Torrential rains impacted much of Myanmar, causing widespread flooding. At least 46 people were killed and more than 200,000 were affected. Additionally, at least 17,000 homes were destroyed. Tremendous rains fell across southeastern Bangladesh, with accumulations Komen and the monsoonal system it originated from reaching 1,051.2 mm (41.39 in) in Chittagong. The resulting floods killed at least 23 people and affected more than 130,400. A landslide in the Bandarban District killed six people. Flooding in Odisha, India, killed five people and affected at least 480,399. At least 69 people died across West Bengal from various incidents directly and indirectly to the storm, such as electrocution and snake bites. A total of 272,488 homes were destroyed while a further 55,899 sustained damage. At least 21 people died in Manipur, 20 of whom perished in a landslide that struck Joumol village.

=== Deep Depression LAND 02 ===
- Deep depression (IMD)
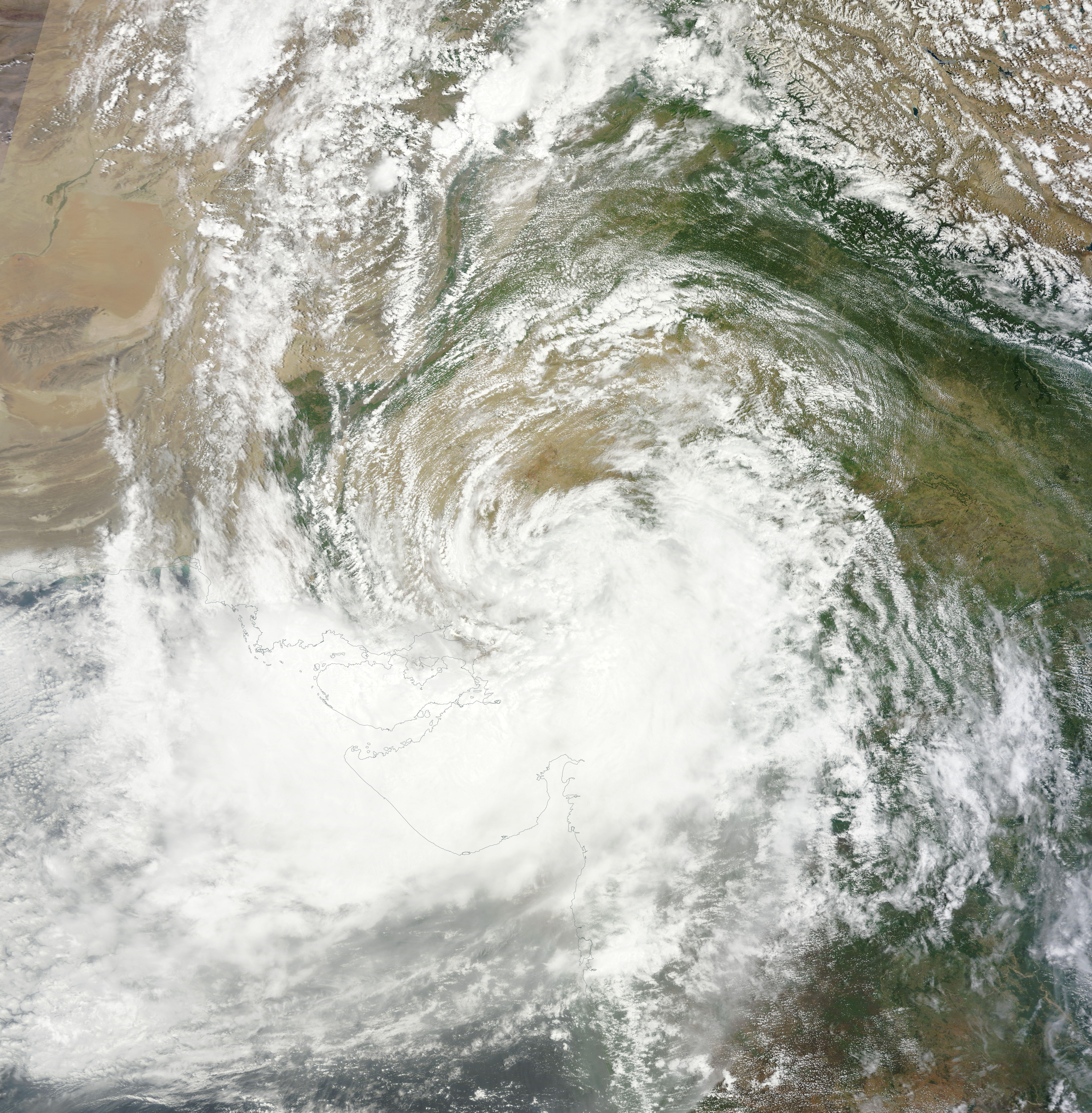
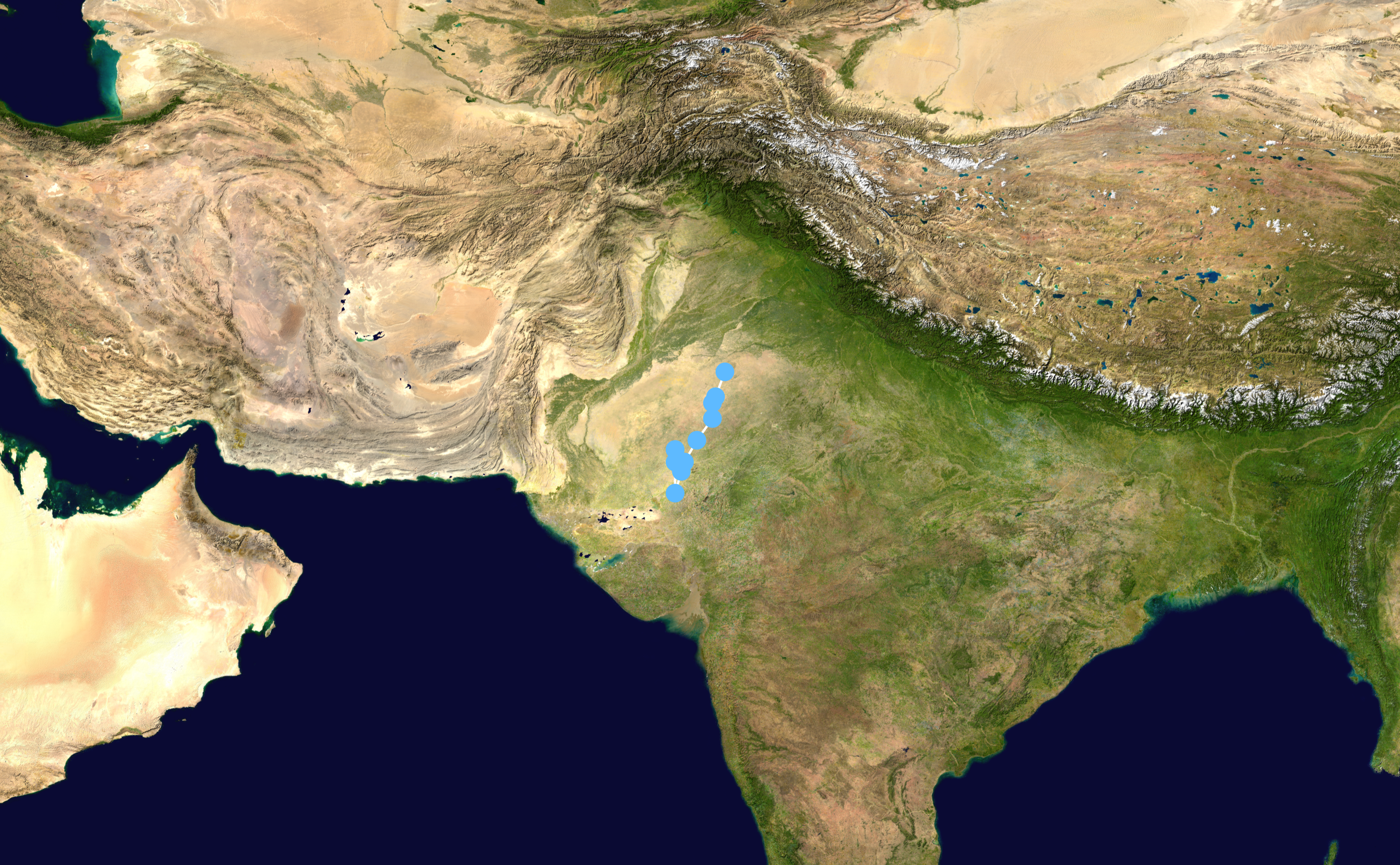
- Duration: July 27 – July 30
- Peak intensity: 55 km/h (35 mph) (3-min); 994 hPa (mbar)

A trough over Madhya Pradesh drifted westwards into eastern Rajasthan and lead to the formation of an area of low pressure in its vicinity on July 24. Continuing on its westward track, the system became more organised and intensified into a depression on July 27, to the west of Jodhpur. A western disturbance over Pakistan and adjoining areas of Jammu and Kashmir kept the system from moving further north into drier portions of Rajasthan. This allowed it to intensify further into a deep depression, about 110 km (68 mi) southeast of Barmer. However, the system accelerated in a chiefly northward track on July 29, absorbing dry air along its path. It weakened rapidly and dissipated to the north of Bikaner on the following day.

Heavy rainfall brought by the system lead to flash flooding in districts of Rajasthan and Gujarat. Chief Minister of Gujarat Anandiben Patel ordered rescue teams to carry out relief activities in Kutch, Patan, Banaskantha, and other districts of the state, as a result.

=== Depression LAND 03 ===
- Depression (IMD)
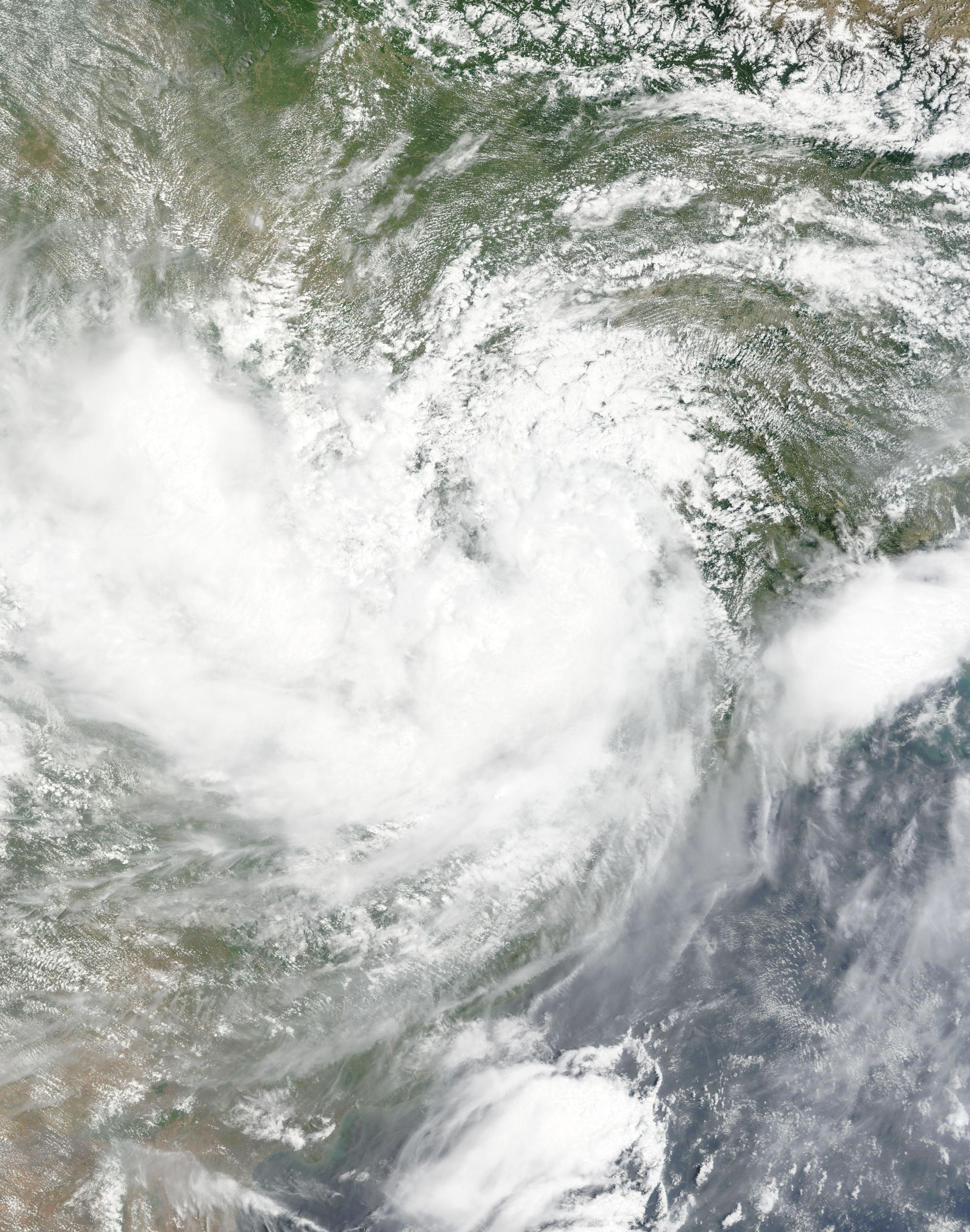
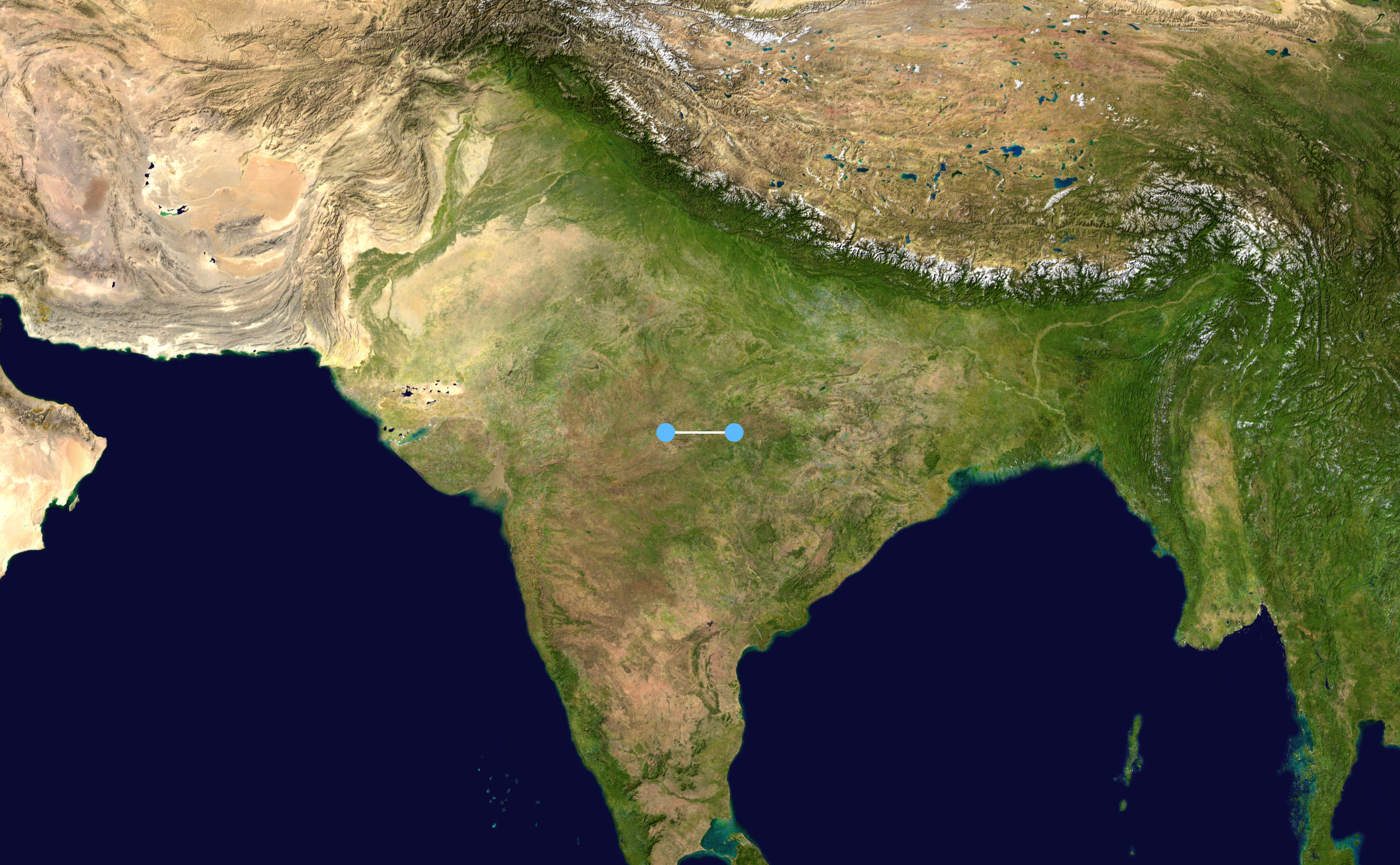
- Duration: August 4 – August 4
- Peak intensity: 45 km/h (30 mph) (3-min); 998 hPa (mbar)

A depression formed in Madhya Pradesh on 4 August and has a maximum winds of 45 km/h (30 mph). One day later it weakened as well marked low-pressure area. It made its impact in Madhya Pradesh.

=== Deep Depression LAND 04 ===
- Deep depression (IMD)
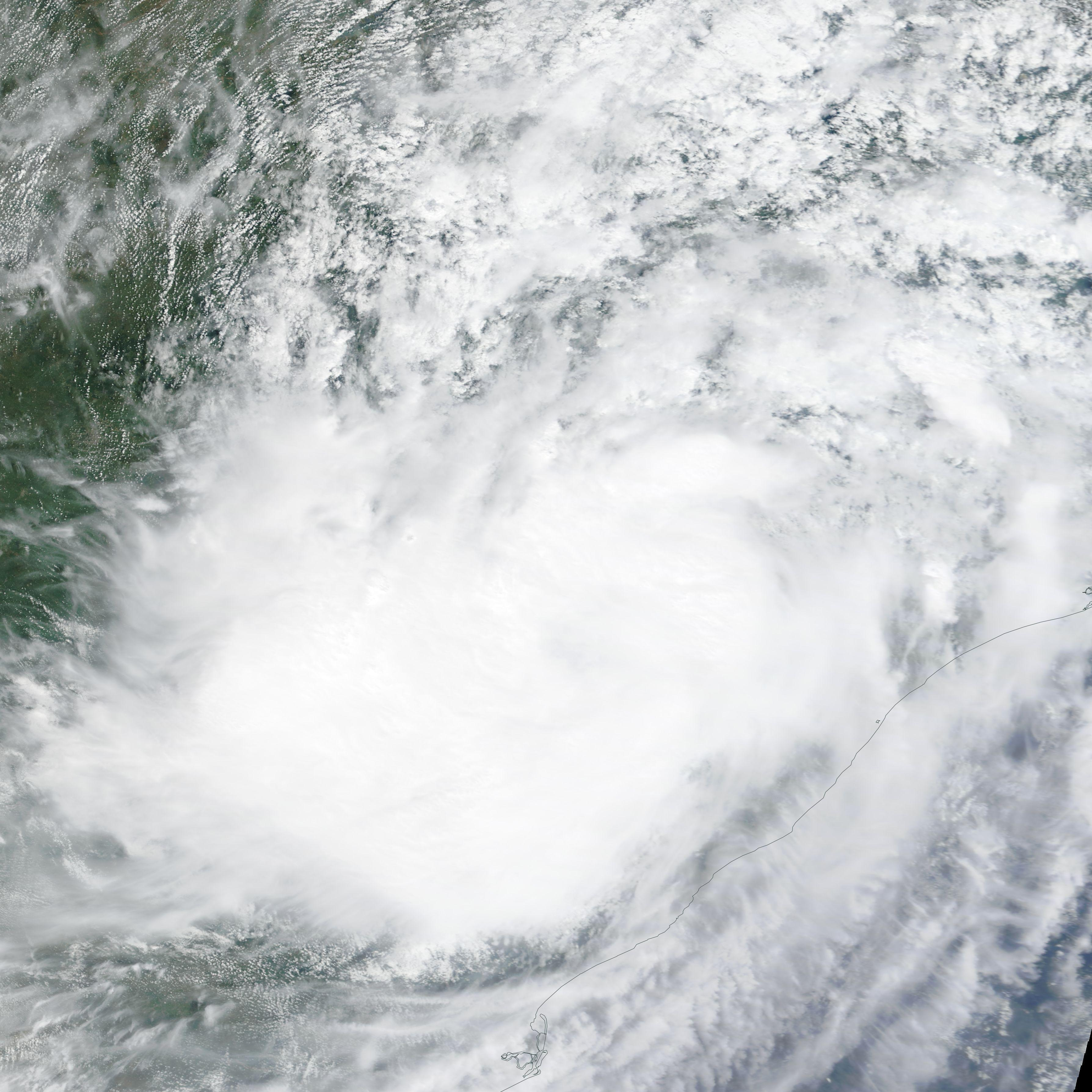
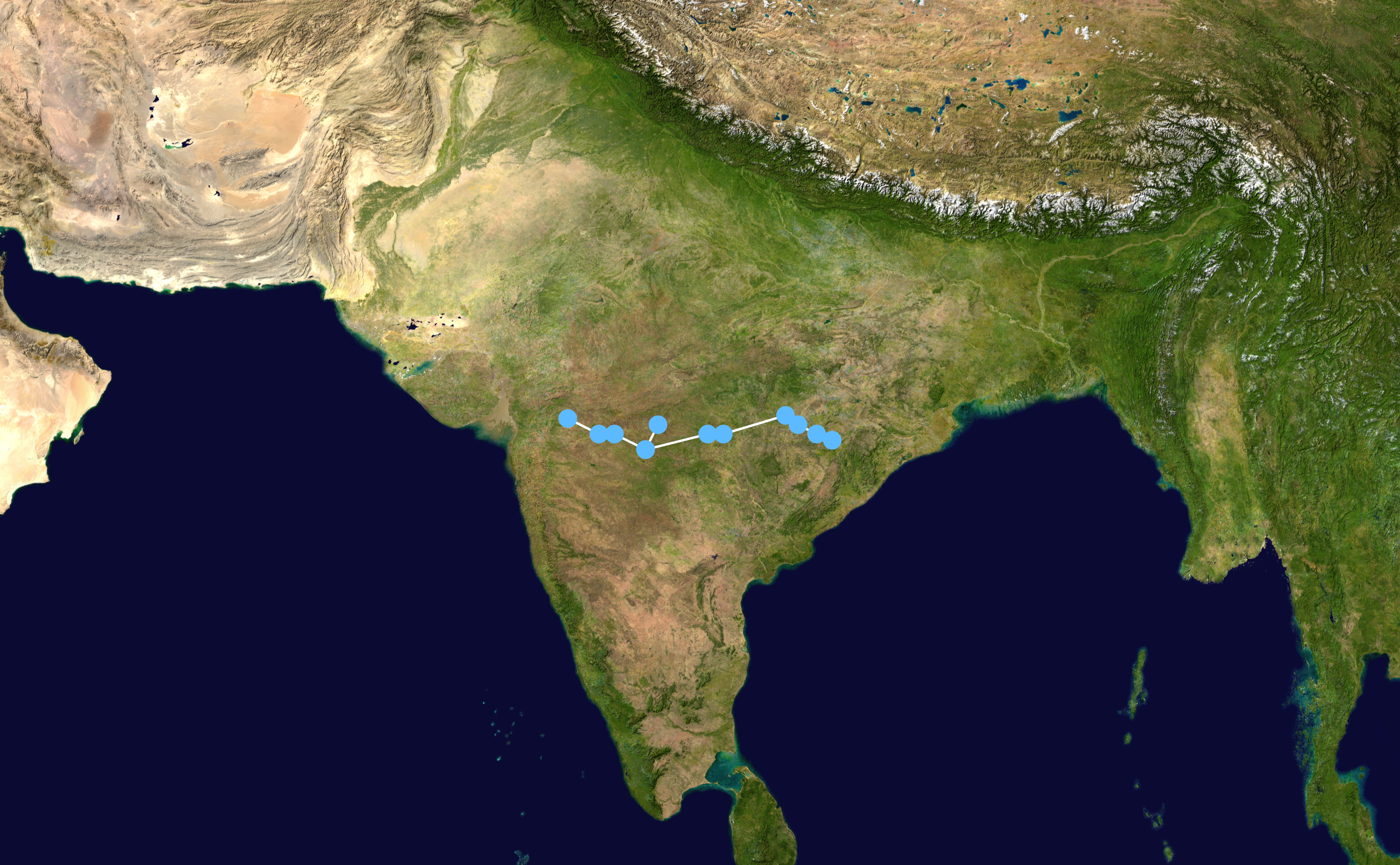
- Duration: September 16 – September 19
- Peak intensity: 55 km/h (35 mph) (3-min); 996 hPa (mbar)

=== Deep Depression ARB 03 (03A) ===
- Deep depression (IMD)
- Tropical storm (SSHWS)
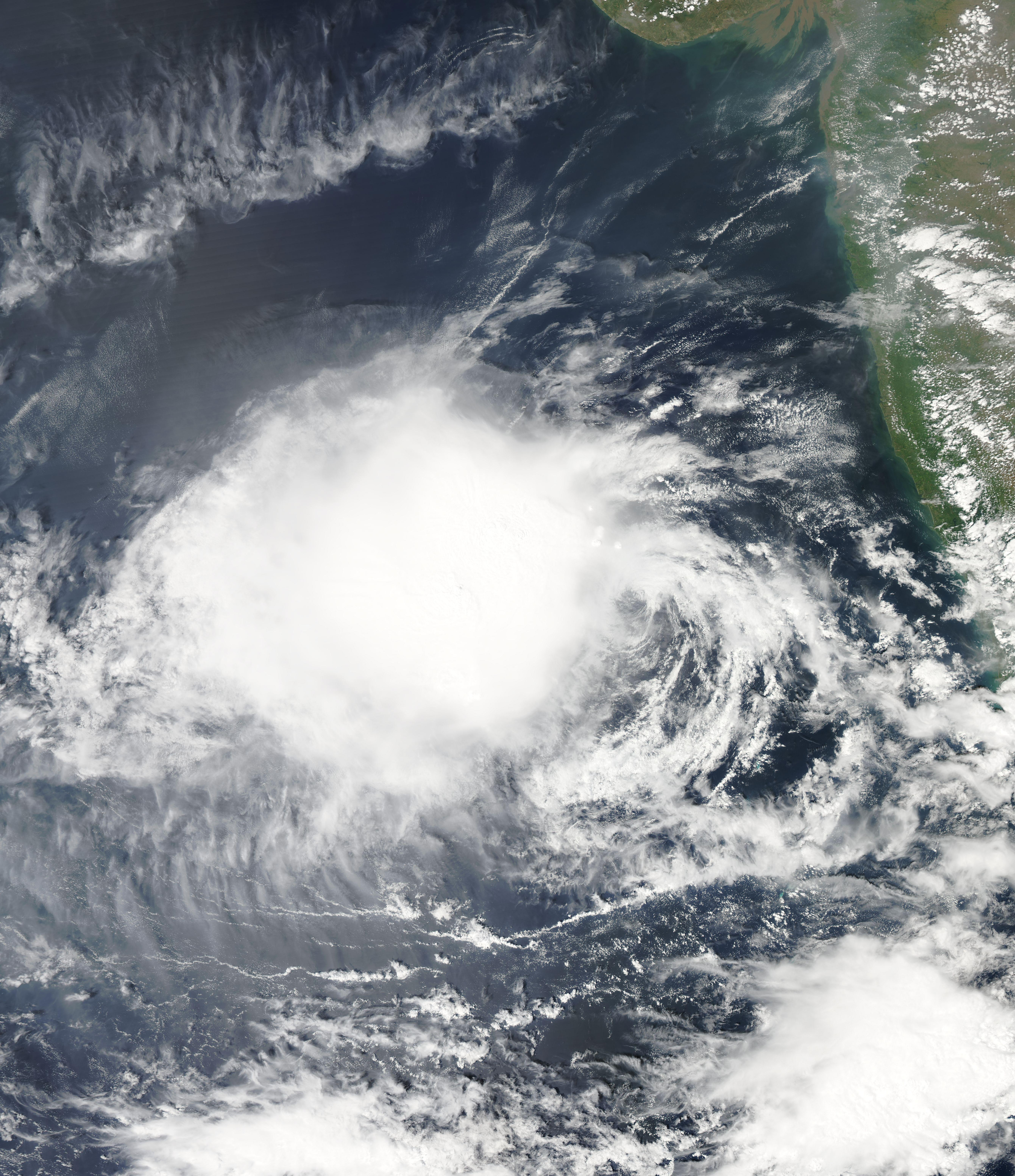
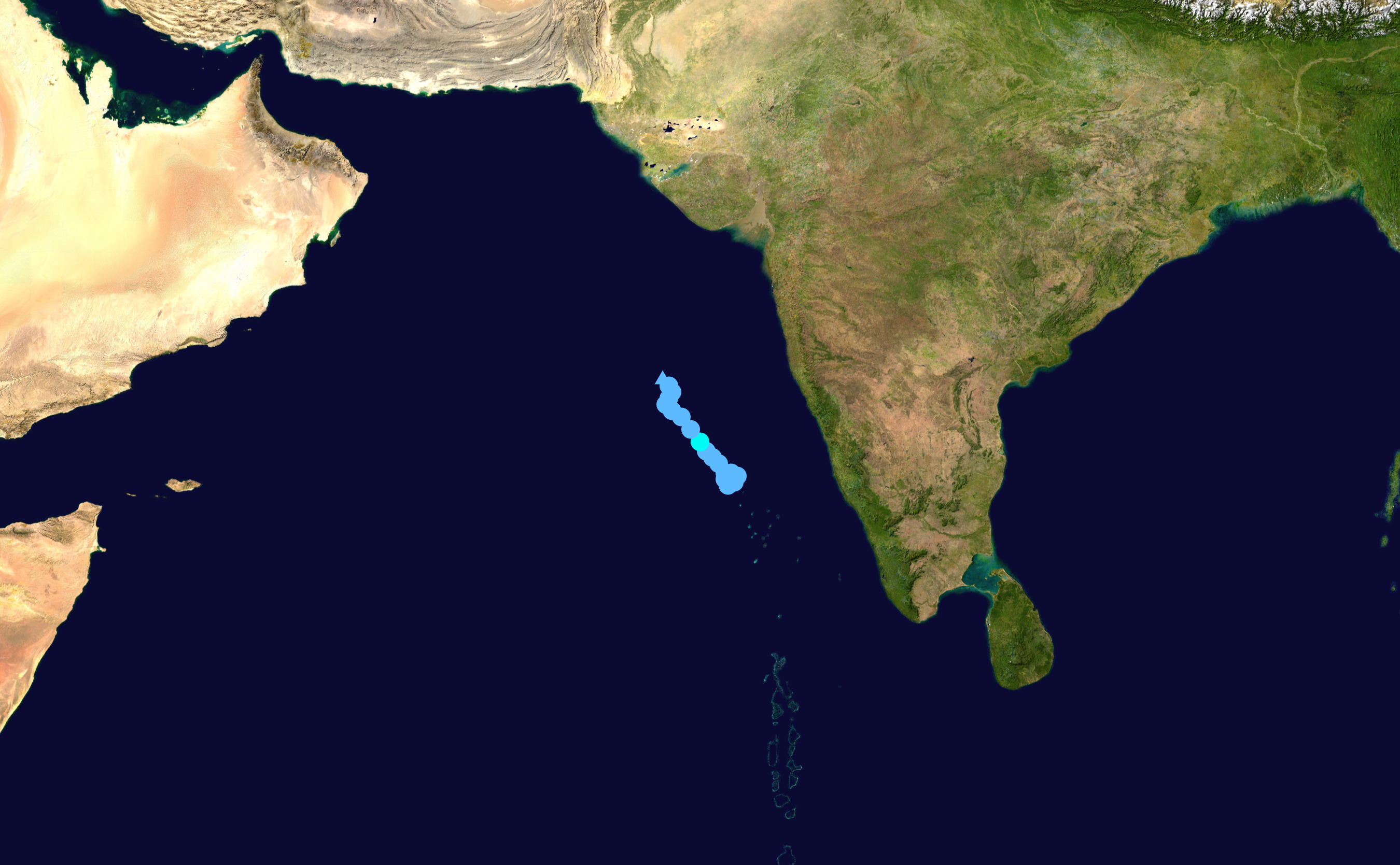
- Duration: October 9 – October 12
- Peak intensity: 55 km/h (35 mph) (3-min); 1000 hPa (mbar)

In early October, a low-pressure area formed over the Arabian Sea. It slowly consolidated, prompting the JTWC to issue a TCFA on October 7. On October 9, the IMD started issuing its advisories for the system, designating it ARB 03. During the late hours of October 9, the JTWC stated the storm had reached gale-force winds, and commenced its advisories. On the following day, the depression intensified into a Deep depression, reaching its peak intensity with sustained wind speeds at 55 km/h (35 mph) and a minimum central pressure estimated near 1,001 mbar (29.56 inHg). On the following days, the storm followed a generally northwestward track, where it encountered areas having low mid-to-upper level moisture in the atmosphere. The system struggled to maintain its intensity and weakened, prompting the JTWC to issue its final warning on ARB 03 in the morning of October 11. On next day, IMD reported that the storm had degenerated into a well-marked low-pressure area.

The storm, being over water during its entire lifespan, did not directly impact any landmass. However, under the influence of the storm's rain bands, heavy Rains lashed the Kanyakumari district of Tamil Nadu, India. The reservoir of Chittar I, a dam near Kanyakumari, recorded 216.4 mm (8.52 in) of rainfall.

=== Extremely Severe Cyclonic Storm Chapala ===
- Extremely severe cyclonic storm (IMD)
- Category 4 tropical cyclone (SSHWS)
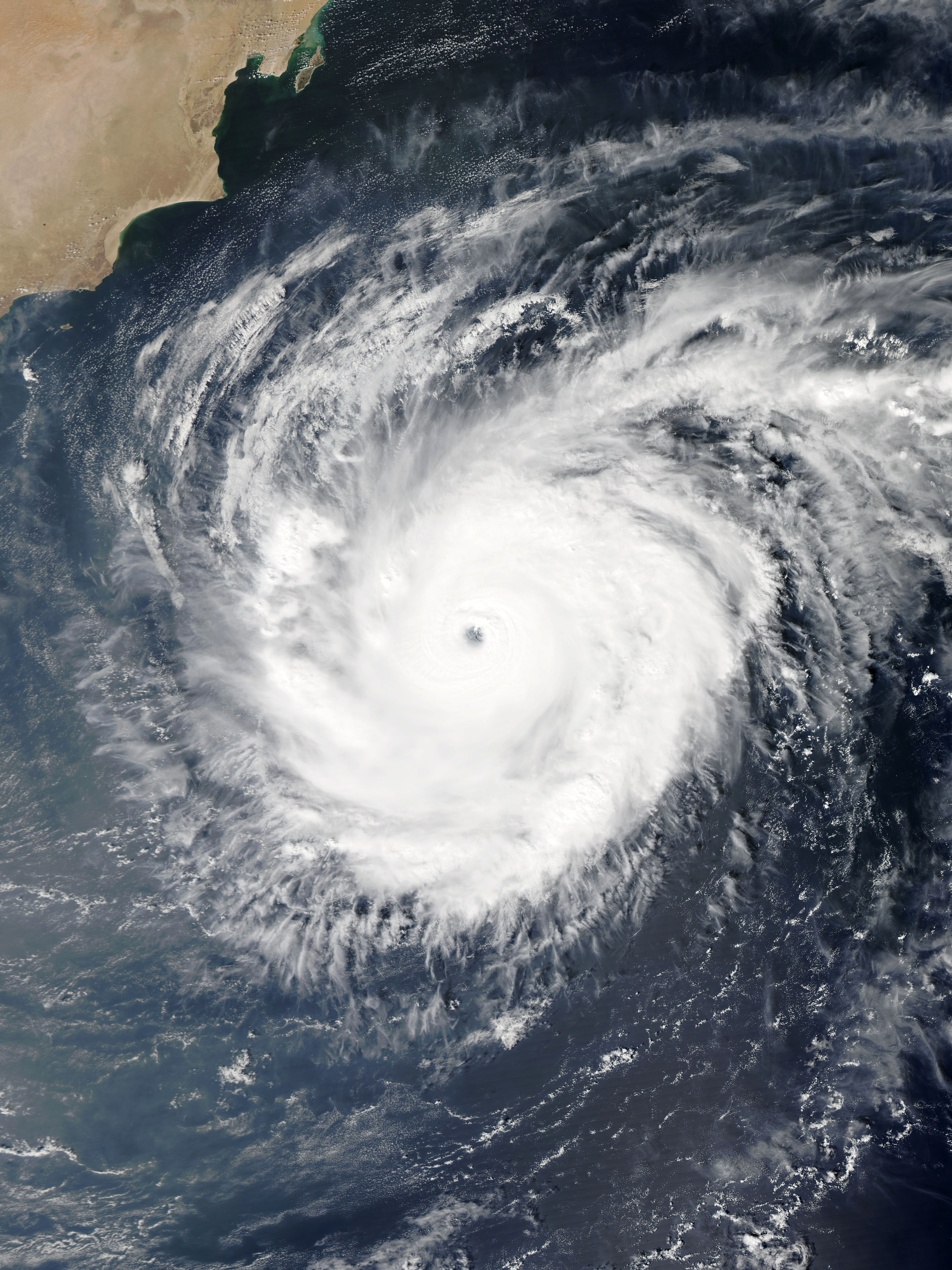
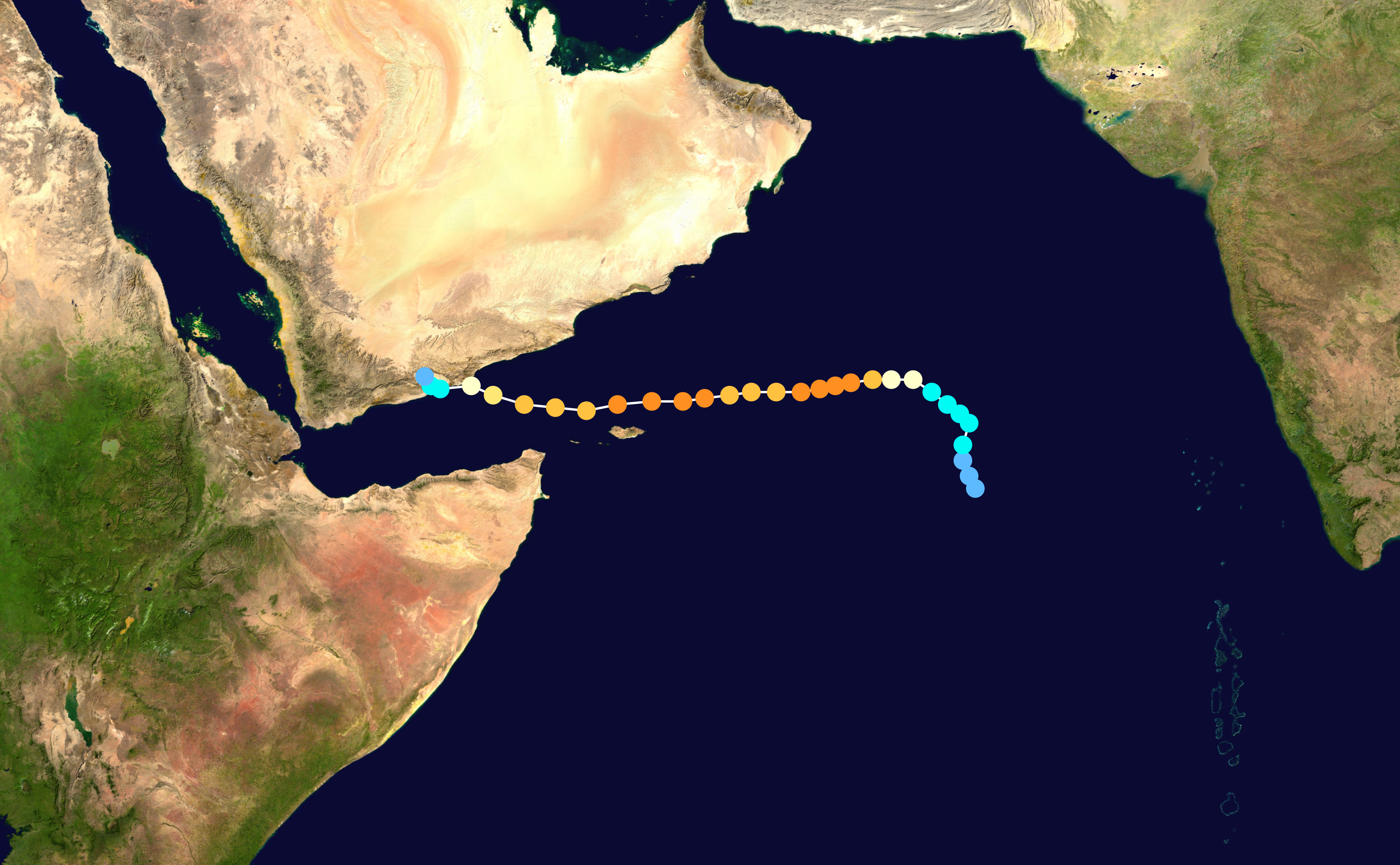
- Duration: October 28 – November 4
- Peak intensity: 215 km/h (130 mph) (3-min); 940 hPa (mbar)

A low-pressure area formed over the Arabian Sea on October 26. It slowly consolidated, prompting the IMD to classify it a depression on October 28. Later the same day, the JTWC issued its Tropical Cyclone Formation Alert (TCFA) for the system, and the IMD upgraded the storm to deep depression intensity. Further intensification ensued, causing the IMD to upgrade the system to a cyclonic storm, naming it Chapala. (Note: The name Chapala (Bengali: চপলা, [ˈt͡ʃɔpɔlaˑ]) was contributed by Bangladesh and means "thunderbolt" in Bengali.) Over the following hours, the storm intensified into a severe cyclonic storm and further into a very severe cyclonic storm. Rapid intensification commenced and Chapala was upgraded into an extremely severe cyclonic storm on October 30. On November 3, it made landfall in Yemen as a very severe cyclonic storm, making it the first tropical cyclone at hurricane intensity to make landfall in the country on record. Chapala rapidly weakened over the mountainous terrain of mainland Yemen and was last noted as a low-pressure area the following day.

Chapala caused widespread damage in mainland Yemen, Socotra and the Puntland region of Somalia. High winds, strong waves, and heavy rainfall affected the southern Yemen coast, with areas in the region receiving 610 mm (24 in) of rainfall over 48 hours, or 700% of the average yearly precipitation. The storm caused severe flooding along the coast, including in Mukalla, the nation's fifth largest city, where the seafront was destroyed by waves exceeding 9 m (30 ft). While passing north of Socotra, Chapala brought heavy rainfall and high winds while inundating the northeastern part of the island. Large swells produced by Chapala caused extensive coastal damage in eastern Puntland, with multiple structures, boats, and roads destroyed. An Iranian vessel capsized offshore on November 1, killing one person.

=== Extremely Severe Cyclonic Storm Megh ===
- Extremely severe cyclonic storm (IMD)
- Category 3 tropical cyclone (SSHWS)
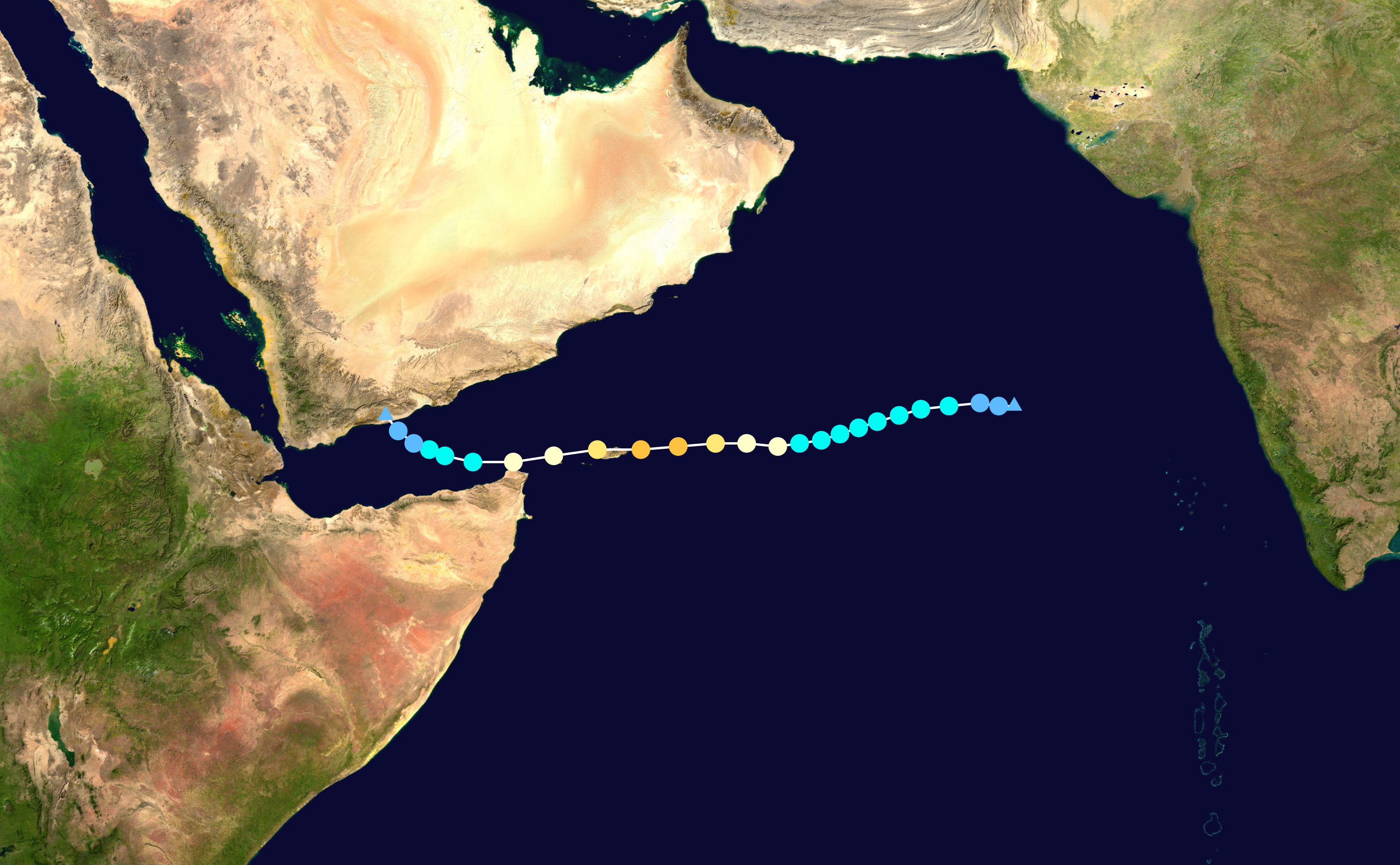
- Duration: November 5 – November 10
- Peak intensity: 175 km/h (110 mph) (3-min); 964 hPa (mbar)

A low-pressure area consolidated into a depression on November 5. It intensified further, prompting the JTWC to issue a TCFA and the IMD to upgrade it into a deep depression. In the following days, the storm's convection flourished as environmental conditions recuperated. By November 8, Megh (Note: The name Megh (Hindi: मेघ, [meːɡʱ]) was contributed by India and means "cloud" in Hindi.) rapidly intensified into a marginal Extremely Severe Cyclonic Storm, peaking with winds exceeding 175 km/h (110 mph) and a minimum central pressure of 964 mbar (28.47 inHg). Maintaining intensity, the storm made its first landfall over Socotra and headed west, skirting the northern tip of Somalia. Megh took a west-northwestward turn, and made its second landfall over the coast of Yemen on November 10 and weakened into a well-marked low-pressure area over mainland Yemen.

Megh's landfall over the island of Socotra as a Category 3-equivalent storm caused extensive devastation, killing at least eighteen people and injuring dozens of others. Another six people were left missing on the island. More than 500 houses were completely destroyed and another 3,000 were damaged. In addition, hundreds of fishing boats were damaged and more than 3,000 families were displaced as a result of Megh.

=== Deep Depression BOB 03 ===
- Deep depression (IMD)
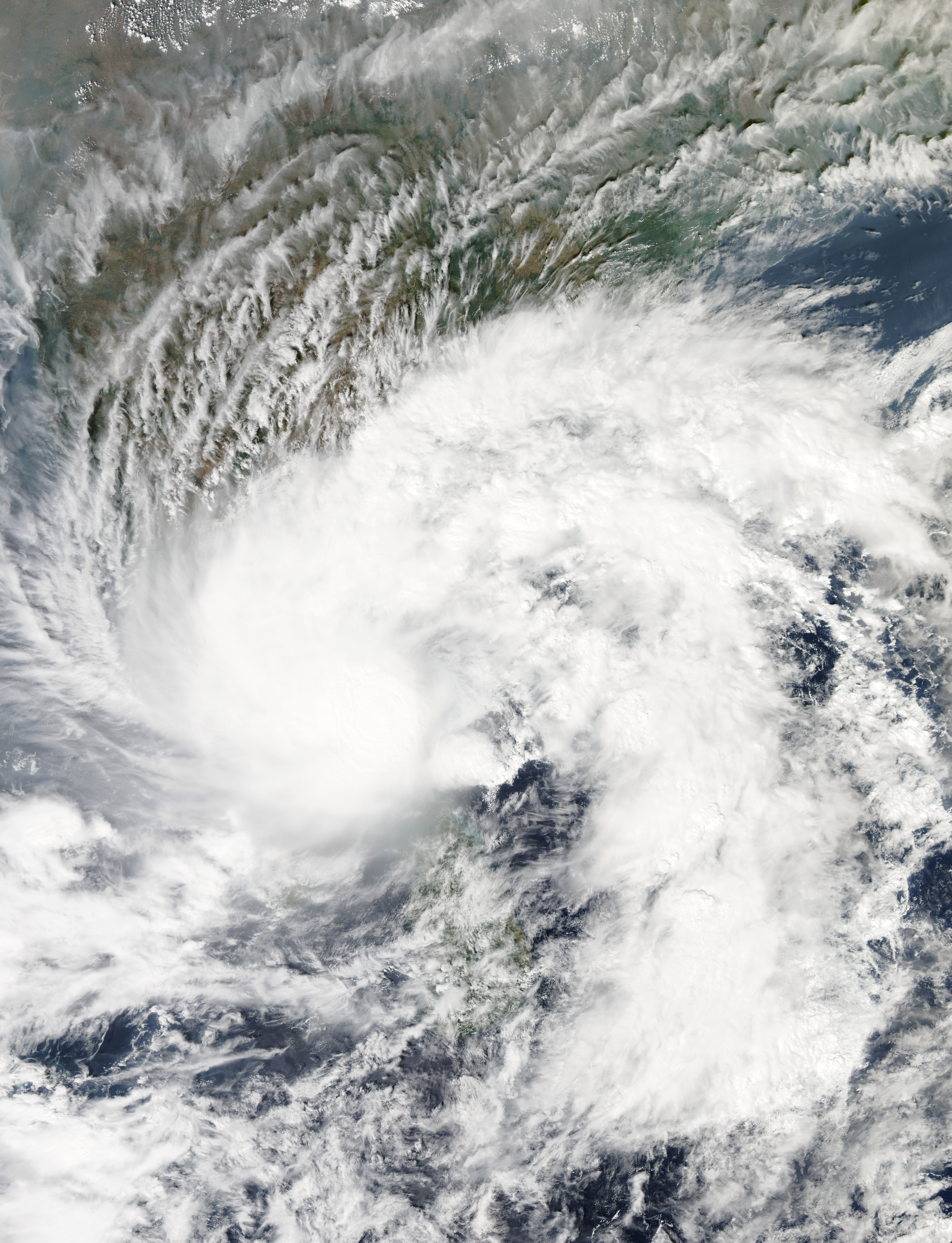
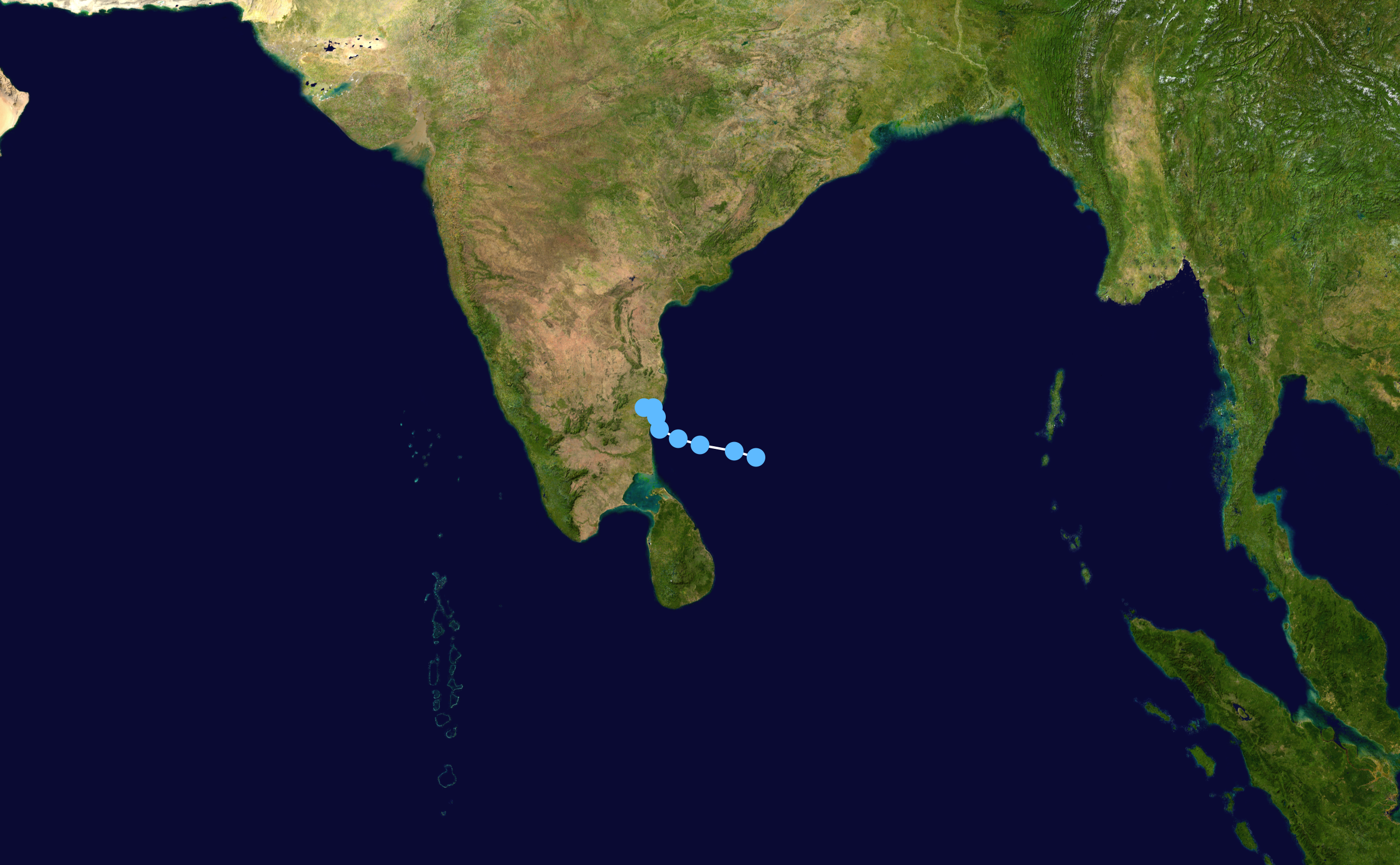
- Duration: November 8 – November 10
- Peak intensity: 55 km/h (35 mph) (3-min); 991 hPa (mbar)

A low-pressure area consolidated into a depression on November 8. It slowly intensified, prompting the JTWC to issue a Tropical Cyclone Formation Alert (TCFA) for the system, but was eventually cancelled despite the improving appearance prior to landfall. The IMD later upgraded the system to a deep depression before it crossed the coast of Tamil Nadu near Puducherry the following day with peak wind speeds of 55 km/h (35 mph) and a minimum central pressure of 991 hPa (29.26 inHg). Due to land interaction and high vertical wind shear, the system weakened into a well-marked low-pressure area over north Tamil Nadu on November 10.

The storm brought heavy rainfall over the coastal districts of Tamil Nadu. Neyveli, a mining township southwest of Puducherry, recorded 139 mm (5.5 in) of rainfall on November 9 and 483 mm (19.0 in) of rainfall on November 10 of which 450 mm (18 in) fell within a span of 9 hours. At least 71 people were killed in various incidents, predominately related to flooding, across Tamil Nadu.

== Season effects ==
This is a table of all storms in the 2015 North Indian Ocean cyclone season. It mentions all of the season's storms and their names, duration, peak intensities (according to the IMD storm scale), damage, and death totals. Damage and death totals include the damage and deaths caused when that storm was a precursor wave or extratropical low, and all of the damage figures are in 2015 USD.

Name	Dates	Peak intensity			Areas affected	Damage (USD)	Deaths	Ref(s).
Name	Dates	Category	Wind speed	Pressure	Areas affected	Damage (USD)	Deaths	Ref(s).
Ashobaa	June 7–12	Cyclonic storm	85 km/h (55 mph)	990 hPa (29.23 inHg)	Oman, United Arab Emirates	Minimal	None	
BOB 01	June 20–21	Depression	45 km/h (30 mph)	994 hPa (29.35 inHg)	East India	Minimal	15	
ARB 02	June 22–24	Deep depression	55 km/h (35 mph)	988 hPa (29.18 inHg)	West India	$260 million	81	
LAND 01	July 10–12	Depression	45 km/h (30 mph)	994 hPa (29.35 inHg)	North India, Nepal	None	None	
Komen	July 26 – August 2	Cyclonic storm	75 km/h (45 mph)	986 hPa (29.12 inHg)	Bangladesh, Myanmar, Northeastern India	$2.06 billion	260	
LAND 02	July 27–30	Deep depression	55 km/h (35 mph)	994 hPa (29.35 inHg)	Central India	None	None	
LAND 03	August 4	Depression	45 km/h (30 mph)	998 hPa (29.47 inHg)	Central India	None	None	
LAND 04	September 16–19	Deep depression	55 km/h (35 mph)	996 hPa (29.41 inHg)	Central India	None	None	
ARB 03	October 9–12	Deep depression	55 km/h (35 mph)	1,000 hPa (29.53 inHg)	None	None	None	
Chapala	October 28 – November 4	Extremely severe cyclonic storm	215 km/h (135 mph)	940 hPa (27.76 inHg)	Oman, Somalia, Yemen	>$100 million	8	
Megh	November 5–10	Extremely severe cyclonic storm	175 km/h (110 mph)	964 hPa (28.47 inHg)	Oman, Somalia, Yemen	Unknown	18	
BOB 03	November 8–10	Deep depression	55 km/h (35 mph)	991 hPa (29.26 inHg)	South India, Sri Lanka	Unknown	71	
Season aggregates
12 systems	June 7 – November 10		215 km/h (135 mph)	940 hPa (27.76 inHg)		>$2.42 billion	453	

== See also ==
- Tropical cyclones in 2015
- 2015 Atlantic hurricane season
- 2015 Pacific hurricane season
- 2015 Pacific typhoon season
- South-West Indian Ocean cyclone seasons: 2014–15, 2015–16
- Australian region cyclone seasons: 2014–15, 2015–16
- South Pacific cyclone seasons: 2014–15, 2015–16
- South Atlantic tropical cyclone
