= Typhoon Nangka (2015) =

Pacific typhoon in 2015

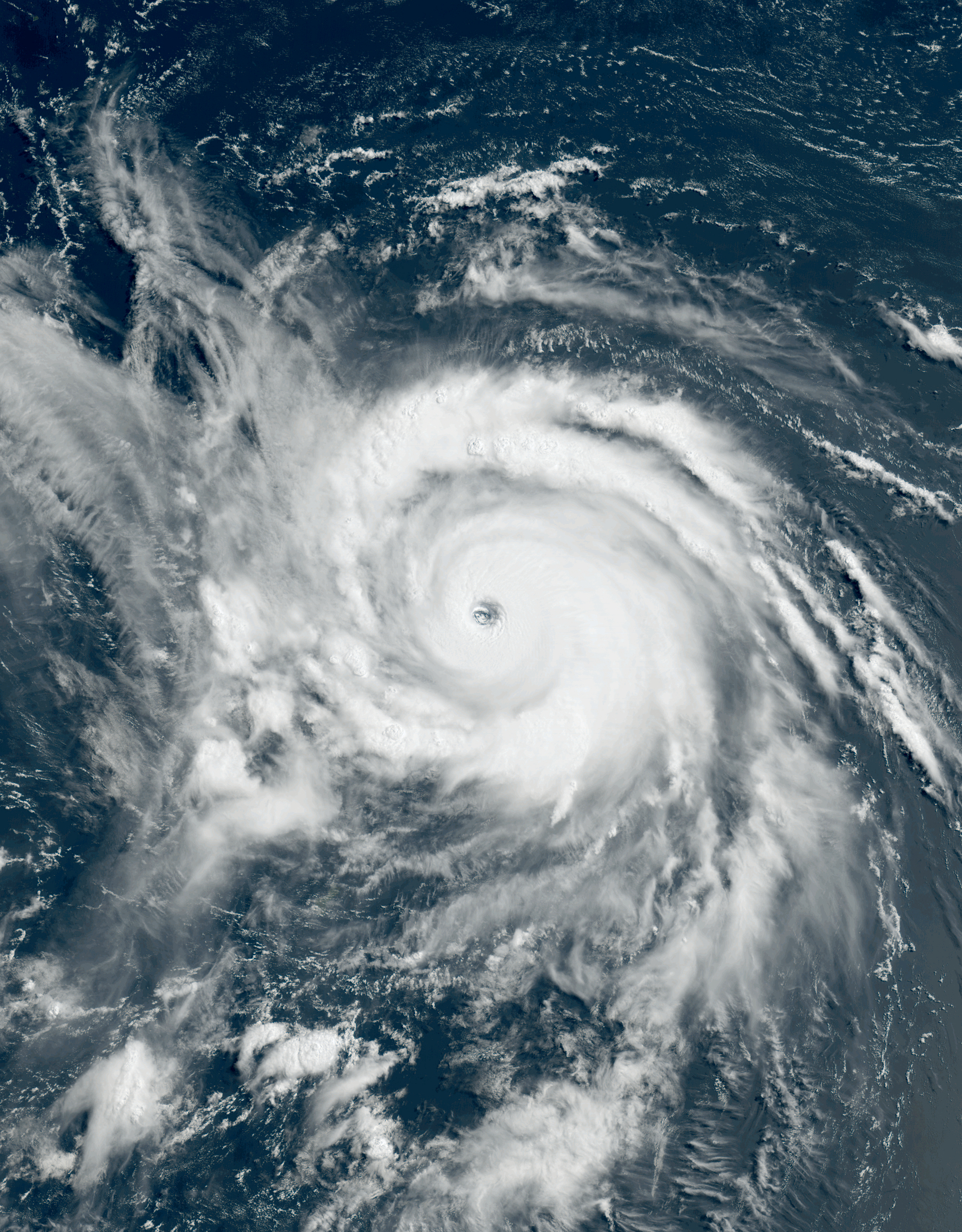
- Typhoon Nangka near peak intensity while passing by the Mariana Islands on July 9

Meteorological history
- Formed: July 2, 2015
- Dissipated: July 18, 2015

Very strong typhoon
- 10-minute sustained (JMA)
- Highest winds: 185 km/h (115 mph)
- Lowest pressure: 925 hPa (mbar); 27.32 inHg

Category 4-equivalent super typhoon
- 1-minute sustained (SSHWS/JTWC)
- Highest winds: 250 km/h (155 mph)
- Lowest pressure: 922 hPa (mbar); 27.23 inHg

Overall effects
- Fatalities: 2 confirmed
- Economic losses: $209 million (2015 USD)
- Areas affected: Marshall Islands, Mariana Islands, Japan
- IBTrACS
- Part of the 2015 Pacific typhoon season

Typhoon Nangka (Note: The name Nangka (Malay: nangka, [ˈnaŋ.ka]) was contributed by Malaysia and means jackfruit (Artocarpus heterophyllus) in Malay.) was a large and powerful tropical cyclone that impacted central Japan in mid-July 2015. Nangka started its long-living journey as a tropical disturbance over the Marshall Islands and west of the International Dateline, becoming the eleventh named storm of the annual typhoon season on July 3. It quickly intensified while moving to the west-northwest, attaining typhoon status on July 6. Nangka moved through the Northern Marianas Islands, passing directly over the uninhabited island of Alamagan. Shortly thereafter, the typhoon attained peak winds; the Japan Meteorological Agency (JMA) estimated 10‑minute sustained winds of 185 km/h (115 mph), while the unofficial Joint Typhoon Warning Center (JTWC) estimated 1‑minute winds of 250 km/h (155 mph), making it a super typhoon. Nangka later weakened as it curved to the north, moving across central Japan on July 16 as a minimal typhoon. The storm weakened soon after, dissipating in the Sea of Japan on July 18.

The storm first affected the Marshall Islands, bringing strong winds to the capital Majuro. Half of the city lost power, and several boats were sunk. Minimal effects were reported in the Northern Marianas Islands, and later the storm's flow enhanced the monsoon over the Philippines. Effects were worst in Japan, where rainfall reached 740 mm (29 in) in Kamikitayama, Nara Prefecture. Total damage across the Kansai region reached ¥18 billion (US$145 million). Nangka killed two people in Japan, injured 55, and damaged or flooded 220 houses.

== Meteorological history ==
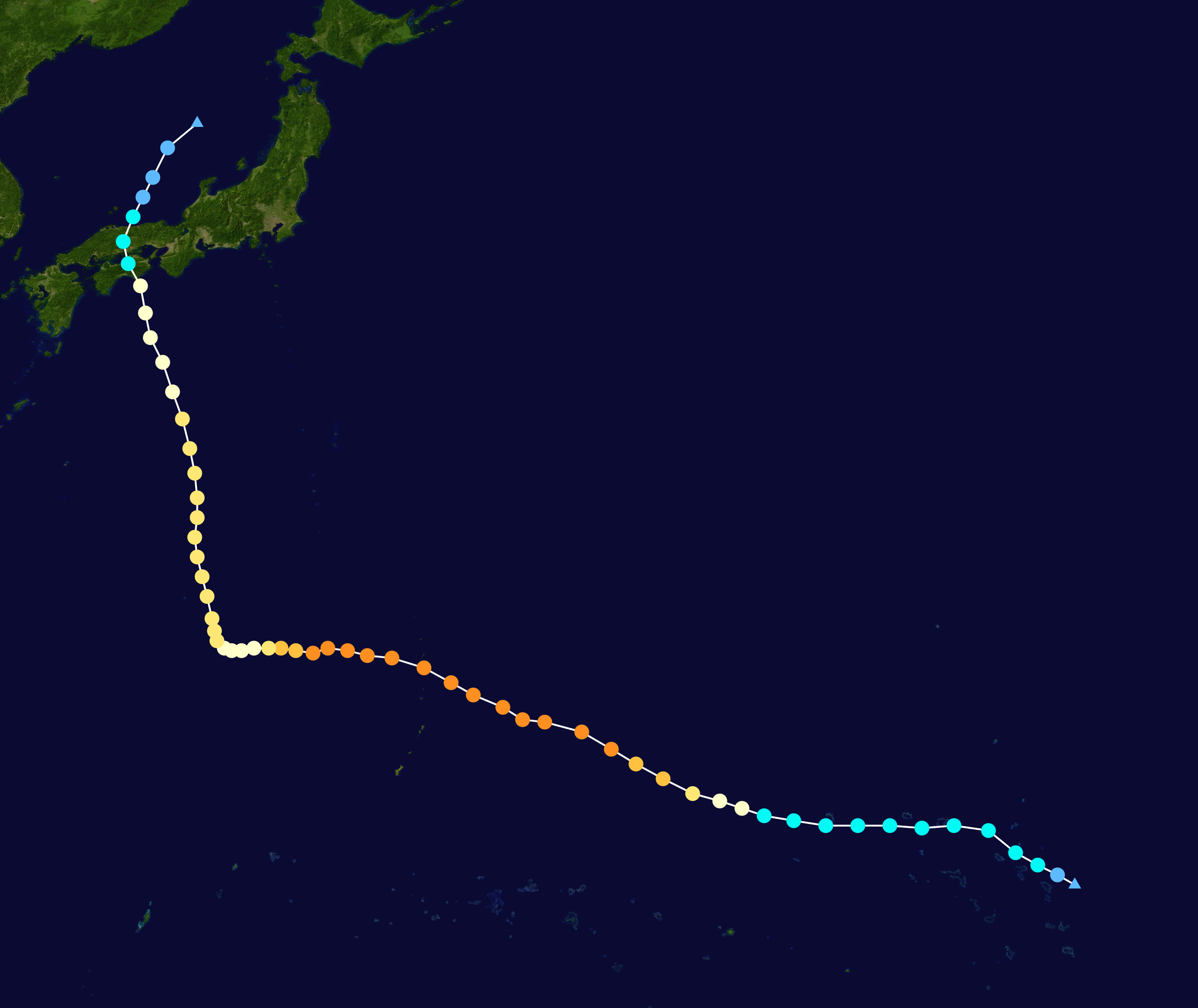
Map plotting the storm's track and intensity, according to the Saffir–Simpson scale Map key Saffir–Simpson scale Tropical depression (≤38 mph, ≤62 km/h) Tropical storm (39–73 mph, 63–118 km/h) Category 1 (74–95 mph, 119–153 km/h) Category 2 (96–110 mph, 154–177 km/h) Category 3 (111–129 mph, 178–208 km/h) Category 4 (130–156 mph, 209–251 km/h) Category 5 (≥157 mph, ≥252 km/h) Unknown Storm type Tropical cyclone Subtropical cyclone Extratropical cyclone, remnant low, tropical disturbance, or monsoon depression

A westerly wind burst spawned Typhoon Chan-hom and Tropical Storm Linfa across the western Pacific Ocean, as well as the system that would become Typhoon Nangka. On July 1, an area of pulsing convection persisted east of the Marshall Islands, associated with a poorly defined circulation. Low wind shear, water sea surface temperatures, and good outflow favored further development. The circulation gradually became more defined as the convection organized more. At 18:00 UTC on July 2, the Japan Meteorological Agency (JMA) classified the system as a tropical depression, about 80 km (50 mi) east of Aur Atoll. Based on the increasing organization, the Joint Typhoon Warning Center (JTWC) classified the system as Tropical Depression 11W at 12:00 UTC on July 3. About six hours later, the JMA upgraded the depression to Tropical Storm Nangka.

When Nangka was upgraded to a tropical storm by the JTWC early on July 4, convective bands were wrapping into the center, but limited by dry air to the west. By that time, the storm was moving to the west-northwest, steered by the subtropical ridge to the north. On July 5, the JMA upgraded the storm to a severe tropical storm. By that time, the circulation had become exposed due to moderate wind shear, although the outflow had improved. On July 6 after shear diminished, Nangka began to quickly intensify as it developed an eye in the center of the blossoming convection. As a result, the JTWC upgraded the storm to typhoon status at 06:00 UTC, followed by the JMA at 12:00 UTC. Nangka reached its first peak intensity at 12:00 UTC on July 7, when JMA estimated 10 minute sustained winds 185 km/h (115 mph). The typhoon was aided by excellent radial outflow enhanced by a TUTT cell to the northwest, and it developed a well-defined eye 48 km (30 mi) in diameter.

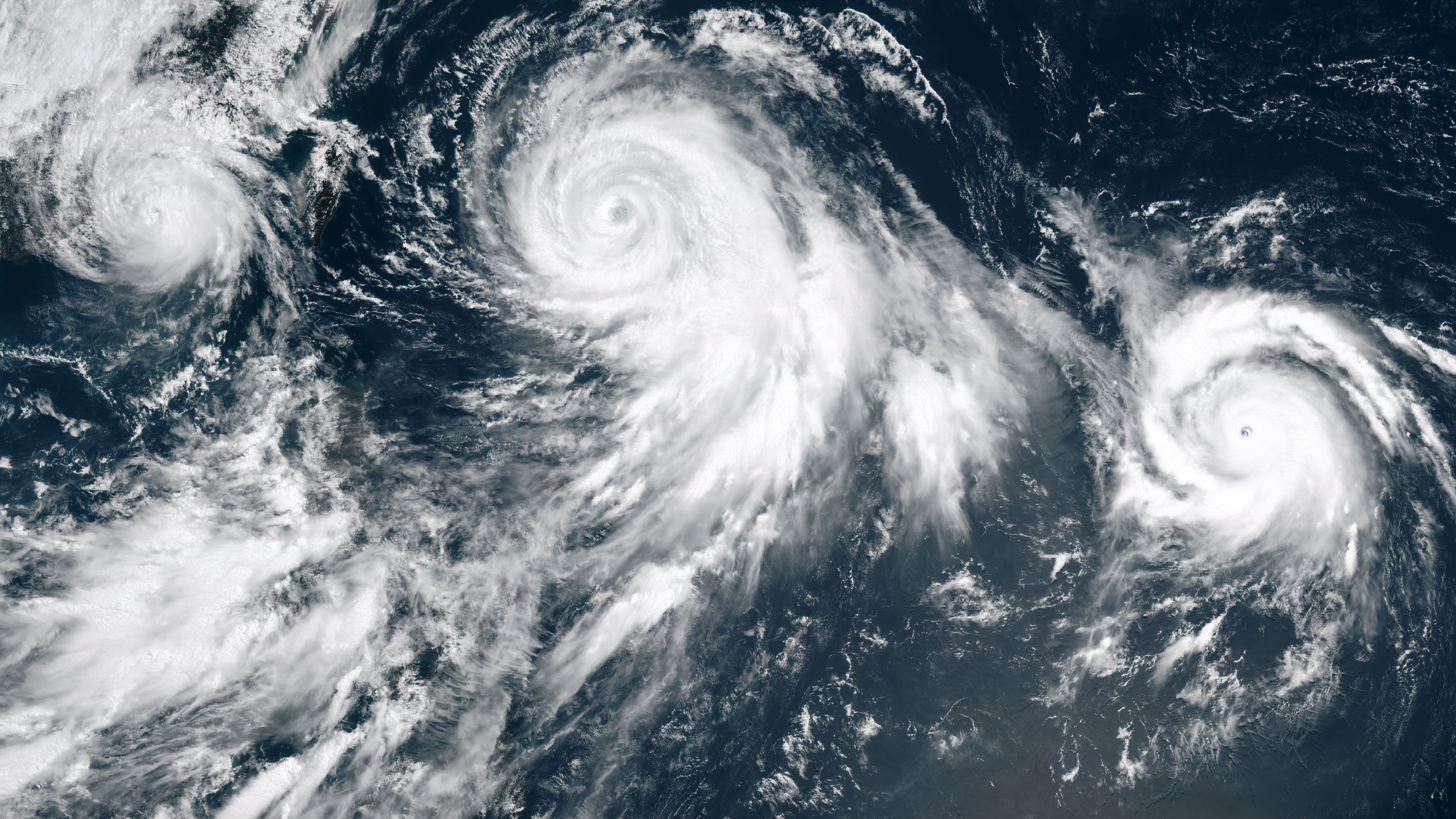
Three simultaneously active typhoons on July 9: (from left to right) Linfa, Chan-hom and Nangka

After reaching its initial peak intensity, Nangka slightly weakened as convection along the west side of the system was restricted due to the TUTT cell, and the eye became cloud-filled. Decreasing wind shear and increasing sea surface temperatures allowed the intensification trend to resume, and the structure became more symmetric late on July 8 as it moved toward the Northern Marianas Islands. A well-defined inner eye re-developed inside of an outer eyewall. On July 9, the JTWC upgraded Nangka to a Category 4-equivalent super typhoon, estimating peak 1 minute winds of 250 km/h (155 mph). The JMA also assessed a 10-minute peak of 185 km/h (115 mph). At 06:00 UTC on July 9, the eye of Nangka passed over the uninhabited island of Alamagan. The typhoon later weakened while turning more to the west due to increased wind shear. The eye became cloud-filled and was no longer visible by July 11, although the organization was sustained by good outflow to the south. However, the convection reorganized the next day and the eye reformed. By that time, Nangka was slowing and nearly stationary as the subtropical ridge receded to the east.

On July 13, Typhoon Nangka began moving northward toward Japan through a break in the ridge. The typhoon completed an eyewall replacement cycle, and according to the JTWC attained a secondary peak of 195 km/h (120 mph). The re-intensification was also aided by a decrease in wind shear, but was short-lived due to drier air from the north and west. As the eye became more ragged, the winds continued to decrease. At 14:00 UTC on July 16, Nangka made landfall along the Japanese island of Shikoku near Muroto, Kōchi, still at typhoon status. Four hours later, the typhoon weakened into a severe tropical storm, and after crossing the Seto Inland Sea, Nangka made a second landfall on Honshu near Kurashiki, Okayama at 21:00 UTC. The convection greatly weakened as it crossed Honshu into the Sea of Japan, and the storm deteriorated further due to lower water temperatures. At 12:00 UTC on July 17, the JMA downgraded Nangka to a tropical depression, and early the next day the JTWC discontinued advisories. On July 18, Nangka dissipated in the central Sea of Japan.

== Preparations and impact ==
On Majuro atoll in the Marshall Islands, the developing Nangka produced strong westerly winds near gale force, producing high waves and flooding along the lagoon. At least 25 vessels in the island's lagoon broke loose from or were dragged by their moorings. High winds from Nangka tore roofs from homes and downed trees and power lines. Nearly half of the nation's capital, Majuro, was left without power. Tony deBrum, the Marshall Island's foreign minister, stated "Majuro [is] like a war zone." Some coastal flooding was also noted, which resulted in crop damage.

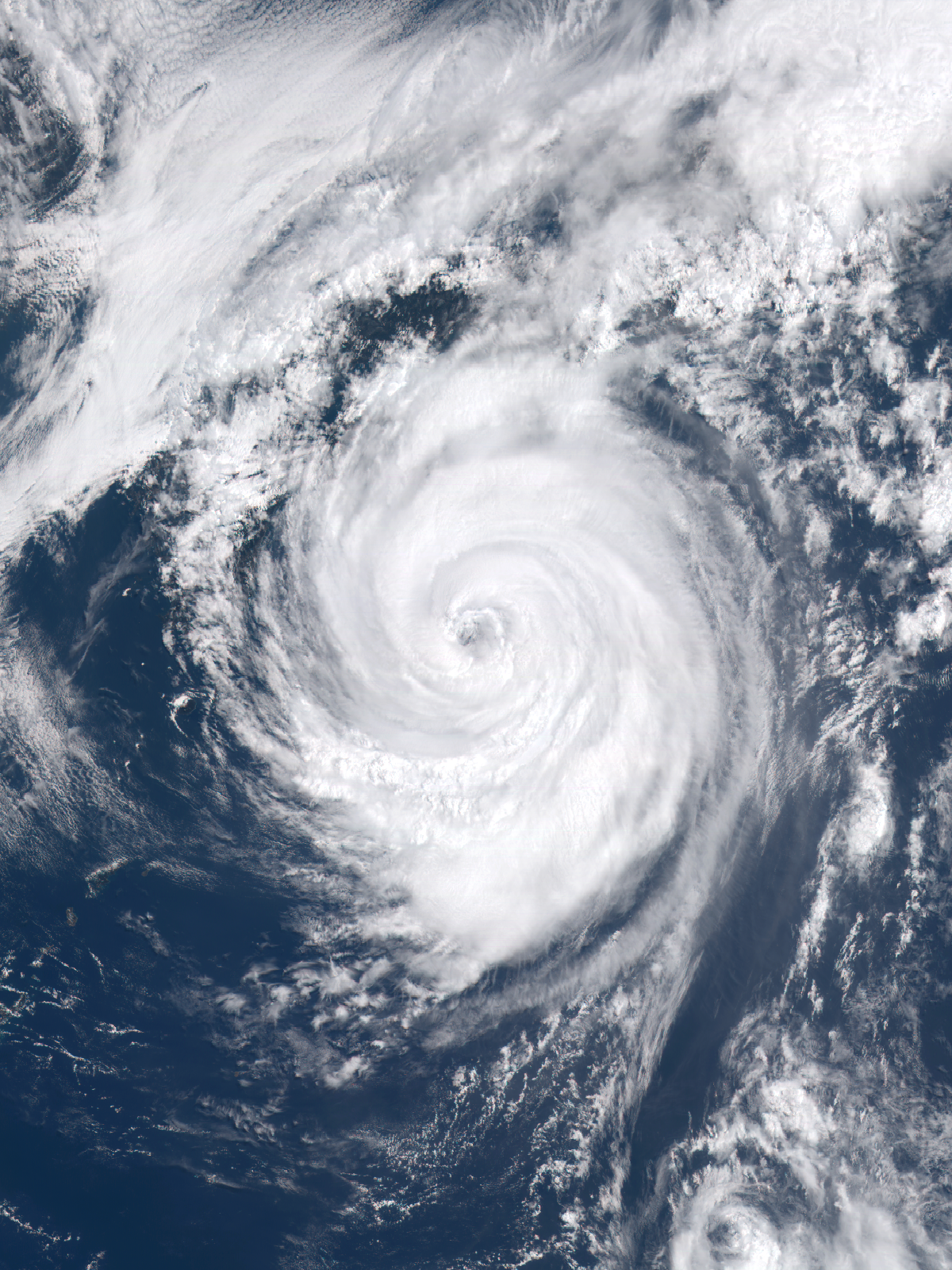
Typhoon Nangka approaching Shikoku, Japan on July 16

Ahead of the storm, the Guam National Weather Service issued a typhoon watch for Agrihan, Pagan, and Alamagan, as well as a high surf advisory for Guam. The watch was later upgraded to a warning, and was canceled after the typhoon exited the region. Flights were delayed or canceled to the region due to the storm and problems with the local aircraft communication system. During the storm, there were minor power outages on Saipan in two villages that were quickly restored. On Alamagan where the storm struck, six people rode out the storm in a concrete bunker.

In the Philippines, the flow from the storm increased the southwest monsoon, causing flash floods and landslides in some areas. The outskirts of the storm later brushed the east coast of South Korea, producing 26 mm (1.0 in) in rainfall, and wind gusts of 93 km/h (58 mph).

=== Japan ===
Due to the threat of the storm, nine airlines canceled 214 flights across Japan. Meanwhile, rail service and highways were disrupted, with a portion of the Chūō Expressway closed, and ferry rides were canceled. The Shikoku Railway Company canceled service during the storm and limited rides along the West Japan Railway Company. About 860,000 people were advised or ordered to evacuate their homes, including 88,100 people from 15,400 homes who were forced to leave. After the storm passed, residents were allowed to return home.

While moving through Japan, Nangka produced peak wind gusts of 153 km/h (95 mph) in Muroto, Kōchi. Heavy rains impacted much of central Japan, peaking at 740 mm (29 in) in Kamikitayama, Nara Prefecture. Owase, Mie recorded 357.5 mm (14.07 in) over 24 hours. The highest hourly rainfall was 84 mm (3.3 in) in Saijō, Ehime. Kawauchi, Fukushima recorded 77.5 mm (3.05 in) over one hour, setting a record for the month of July.

The rains from Nangka caused rivers to exceed their banks. In Tokushima Prefecture, the Naka River flooded to the second story of nearby school buildings. Flooding stranded 1,600 passengers on a train for four hours, which had been traveling from Tsuruga, Fukui to Himeji, Hyōgo. Across Japan, strong waves and high winds killed over 11,000 bluefin tuna on a fish farm in Kushimoto, accounting for ¥1.29 billion (US$10.4 million) in losses. About 15,000 people lost power across the country. The storm damaged 30 homes and flooded another 190, and also damaged farming equipment. There were 55 injuries and two deaths related to the typhoon, including an elderly man who drowned after falling into a ditch. Damage in Kansai region reached ¥18 billion (US$145 million). Total economic losses across the nation were calculated at ¥26 billion (US$209 million).

== See also ==
- Weather of 2015
- Tropical cyclones in 2015
- Other tropical cyclones named Nangka
- Typhoon Oliwa (1997)
- Tropical Storm Talas (2011)
- Typhoon Halong (2014)
