= List of storms named Egay =

The name Egay has been used for six tropical cyclones in the Philippine Area of Responsibility by PAGASA in the Western Pacific Ocean.

- Typhoon Soudelor (2003) (T0306, 07W, Egay) – approached the Philippines, South Korea and Japan.
- Typhoon Sepat (2007) (T0708, 09W, Egay) – struck Taiwan and China.
- Tropical Storm Haima (2011) (T1104, 06W, Egay) – approached the Philippines and Taiwan.
- Severe Tropical Storm Linfa (2015) (T1510, 10W, Egay) – affected South China.
- Tropical Depression 04W (2019) (04W, Egay) – stayed at sea with minor impacts.
- Typhoon Doksuri (2023) (T2305, 05W, Egay) – a powerful and destructive Category 4 super typhoon that ravaged northern Philippines, Taiwan and China in mid to late-July.

The name Egay was retired following the 2023 Pacific typhoon season and was replaced with Emil.
