= Typhoon Soudelor (2003) =

Pacific typhoon in 2003

Typhoon Soudelor (Egay)
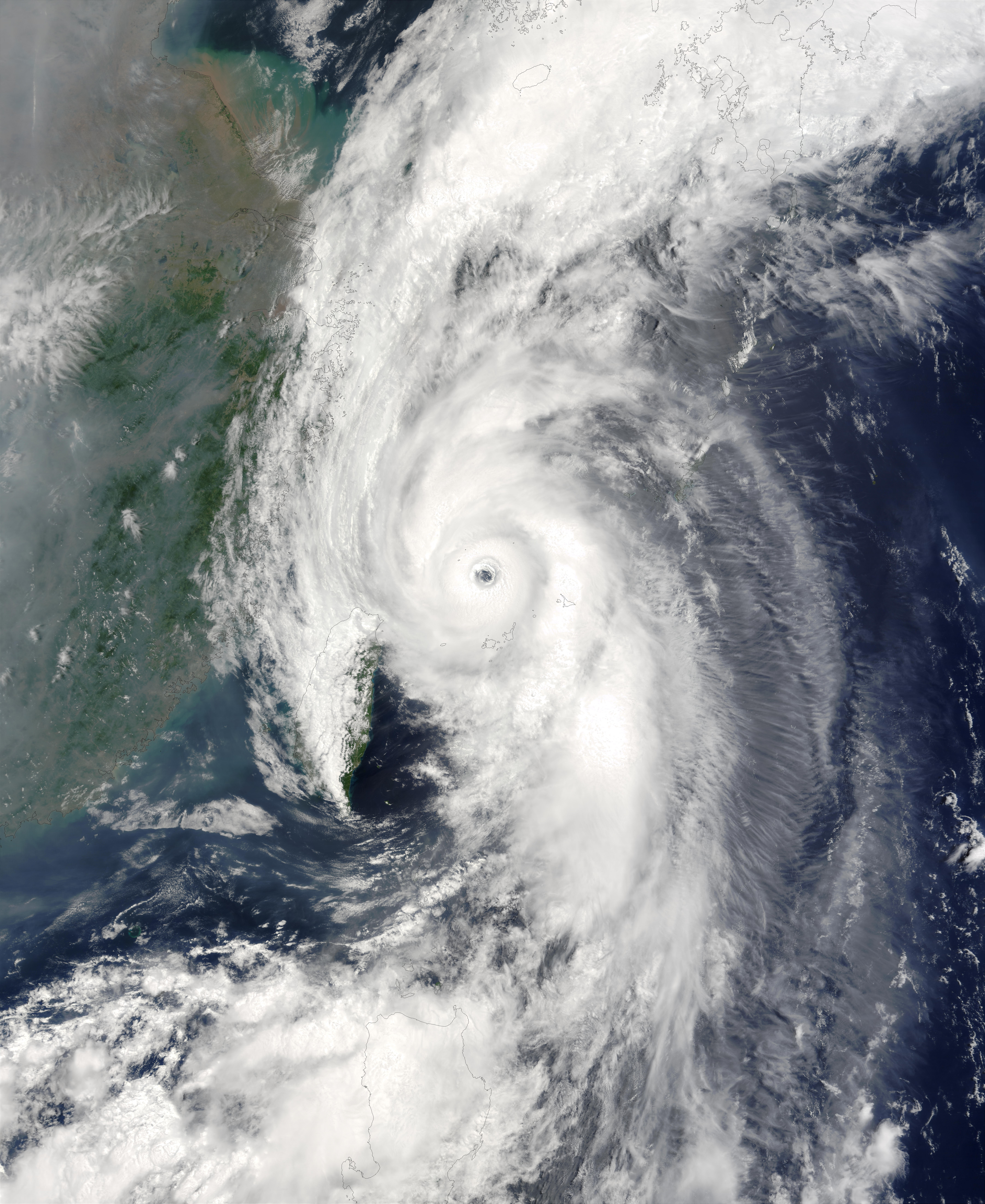
- Typhoon Soudelor near peak intensity on June 18

Meteorological history
- Formed: June 11, 2003
- Extratropical: June 19, 2003
- Dissipated: June 24, 2003

Typhoon
- 10-minute sustained (JMA)
- Highest winds: 150 km/h (90 mph)
- Lowest pressure: 955 hPa (mbar); 28.20 inHg

Category 4-equivalent typhoon
- 1-minute sustained (SSHWS/JTWC)
- Highest winds: 215 km/h (130 mph)
- Lowest pressure: 927 hPa (mbar); 27.37 inHg

Overall effects
- Fatalities: 14 direct
- Missing: 2
- Damage: >$15.3 million (2003 USD)
- Areas affected: Philippines, Taiwan, Japan, and South Korea
- IBTrACS
- Part of the 2003 Pacific typhoon season

Typhoon Soudelor, (Note: The name Soudelor (Pohnpeian: Sau Deleur, [sʲɐuteleur]) was contributed by the Federated States of Micronesia and refers to legendary Pohnpeian chiefs during the Saudeleur Dynasty in Pohnpeian.) known in the Philippines as Typhoon Egay, was a powerful typhoon that underwent rapid deepening east of Taiwan in the 2003 Pacific typhoon season. It was the sixth named storm by the Japan Meteorological Agency (JMA) of the season, as well as the third typhoon. It formed on June 12 from a disturbance in the monsoon trough, located east of the Philippines. The system moved generally to the northwest after its genesis, gradually intensifying into a tropical storm. While offshore the Philippines, Soudelor dropped heavy rainfall that caused flooding and left thousands homeless. The storm caused $2.46 million in damage, (Note: All damage totals are in 2003 United States dollars unless otherwise noted.) and 12 deaths.

After affecting the Philippines, Soudelor moved into an area of low wind shear and with favorable outflow. It became a typhoon on June 17, and quickly developed an eye while rapidly intensifying. The storm struck the Japanese island of Iriomote-jima, where wind gusts reached 204 km/h (127 mph). It also affected Taiwan, where floods covered highways and caused mudslides. Early on June 18, Soudelor reached peak 10-minute sustained winds of 150 km/h (90 mph). (Note: The Japan Meteorological Agency uses 10-minute sustained winds, while the Joint Typhoon Warning Center uses 1-minute sustained winds. The conversion factor between the two is 1.14.) Subsequently, an increase in shear and the passage of a trough weakened the typhoon and caused it to turn to the northeast. Soudelor weakened to a tropical storm on June 19, and subsequently it passed between Japan and South Korea. It became an extratropical cyclone that day, dissipating on June 24. In Japan, the storm caused widespread power outages, although damage was minimal, and there were 21 injuries. In South Korea, there was $12.1 million in damage and two deaths.

== Meteorological history ==
Map plotting the storm's track and intensity, according to the Saffir–Simpson scale Map key Saffir–Simpson scale Tropical depression (≤38 mph, ≤62 km/h) Tropical storm (39–73 mph, 63–118 km/h) Category 1 (74–95 mph, 119–153 km/h) Category 2 (96–110 mph, 154–177 km/h) Category 3 (111–129 mph, 178–208 km/h) Category 4 (130–156 mph, 209–251 km/h) Category 5 (≥157 mph, ≥252 km/h) Unknown Storm type Tropical cyclone Subtropical cyclone Extratropical cyclone, remnant low, tropical disturbance, or monsoon depression

The origins of Soudelor were from a tropical disturbance that persisted a short distance northwest of Pohnpei on June 7. By two days later, it had a large area of convection, and it moved generally westward. Late on June 9, the Joint Typhoon Warning Center (JTWC) (Note: The Joint Typhoon Warning Center is a joint United States Navy – United States Air Force task force that issues tropical cyclone warnings for the western Pacific Ocean and other regions.) issued a tropical cyclone formation alert (TCFA), although the system initially failed to develop due to wind shear in the region. The thunderstorms decreased over the increasingly exposed circulation. On June 11, the shear decreased, and convection became better organized. The JTWC initiated warnings on Tropical Depression 07W late that day, and at 0000 UTC on June 12, the Japan Meteorological Agency (JMA) (Note: The Japan Meteorological Agency is the official Regional Specialized Meteorological Center for the western Pacific Ocean.) also remarked that a tropical depression had formed to the northeast of Palau.

After forming, the depression tracked generally westward due to a subtropical ridge to the north. Around that time, it was still located within the monsoon trough, and it interacted with another circulation to its east-southeast, causing a motion to the west-northwest. As it moved away from the other circulation, the depression was able to intensify, and the wind shear decreased. On June 13 the JMA upgraded the depression to Tropical Storm Soudelor to the east of Samar Island in the Philippines. That day, the Philippine Atmospheric, Geophysical and Astronomical Services Administration PAGASA initiated advisories and gave it the local name "Egay". Upon becoming a tropical storm, Soudelor developed rainbands to the north and south, although it could not intensify significantly due to a tropical upper tropospheric trough to the east. A mid-latitude trough to the north weakened the ridge, which allowed Soudelor to turn more to the northwest off the northeast coast of the Philippines. The circulation became exposed from the deepest convection, and around that time the storm was located about 160 km (100 mi) east of Samar Island. Thunderstorms gradually increased, and the outflow improved. Late on June 16, the JTWC upgraded Soudelor to a typhoon, and the next day the JMA followed suit when the storm was located southeast of Taiwan.

Around the time that Soudelor became a typhoon, it began moving toward the north, influenced by an approaching trough, and it passed about 95 km (60 mi) northeast of Luzon. A ragged eye developed early on June 17, which quickly became better organized. With its outflow enhanced by the approaching trough, Soudelor rapidly intensified to the east of Taiwan. The typhoon struck the Japanese island of Iriomote-jima at around 2030 UTC on June 17. At 0600 UTC on June 18, the JTWC estimated peak 1‑minute winds of 215 km/h (135 mph). At the same time, JMA estimated peak 10‑minute winds of 150 km/h (90 mph) when it was located west of Okinawa. While at its maximum strength, Soudelor had a circular eye 33 km (21 mi) in diameter. It turned to the north-northeast, maintaining its peak winds for about 12 hours before increased shear from the westerlies caused weakening. The eye quickly dissipated, and the system began transitioning into an extratropical cyclone. Early on June 19, the JMA downgraded Soudelor below typhoon status, and the storm later crossed Tsushima Island into the Sea of Japan. At 1500 UTC that day, the JMA declared the storm as extratropical while it was near the Oki Islands; the JTWC followed suit three hours later. The extratropical remnants of Soudelor continued to the northeast, crossing northern Japan on June 20. The storm slowed and turned to the east, dissipating on June 24.

== Preparations ==
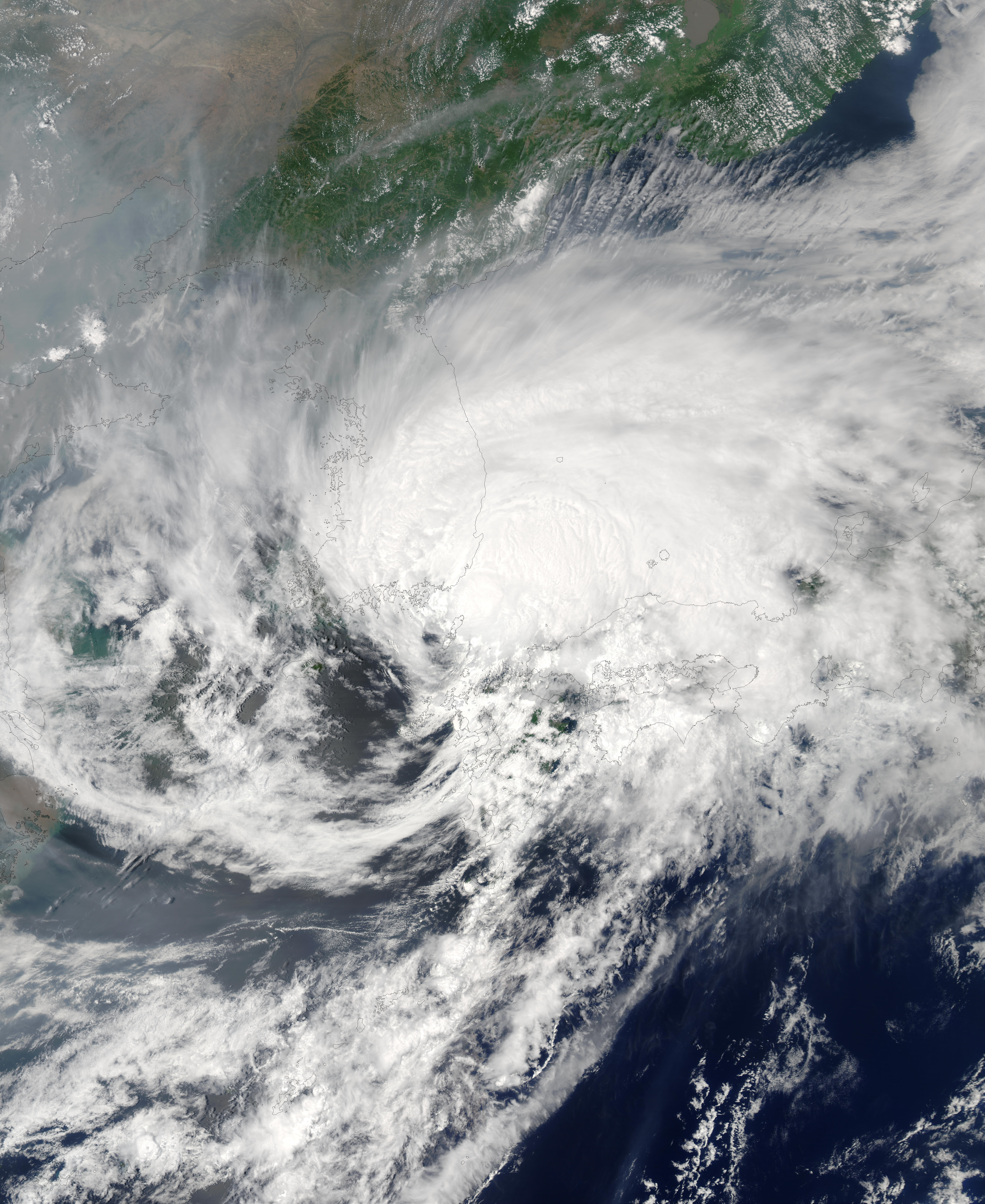
Tropical Storm Soudelor near South Korea and Japan on June 19

By June 16, PAGASA raised storm signal number 3 for Batanes and the provinces of Cagayan and Isabela; storm signal number 2 for all or portions of nine provinces and for Polillo Island; and storm signal number 1 was raised for portions of four provinces. The signals refer to the potential for winds, from lowest to highest representing weakest to strongest winds; number 3 refers to the potential for winds of 100 to 185 km/h (62 to 115 mph) within 18 hours.

On June 16, the Central Weather Bureau issued sea and land warnings in Taiwan as Soudelor was anticipated to produce torrential rains, gale-force winds, and rough seas. All fishermen in the area were urged to return to port before the onset of the typhoon. As the typhoon tracked near Taiwan, the Japan Meteorological Agency began advising residents in Okinawa to closely monitor the storm. One of the major airlines in Japan, All Nippon Airways, cancelled 66 domestic flights the same day, stranding an estimated 6,000 people. During the storm, 257 domestic flights were canceled, and train and ferry service was canceled. In Nagasaki Prefecture, 732 schools were closed during the storm. Hundreds of people voluntarily evacuated in Japan.

On June 17, the Korean Meteorological Agency issued rain warnings for Jeju Island and coastal areas of South Korea. They also urged residents to take all precautions for the storm. The Korea Airports Corporation reported that 111 flights to southern areas of the country were cancelled due to the typhoon.

== Impact and aftermath ==
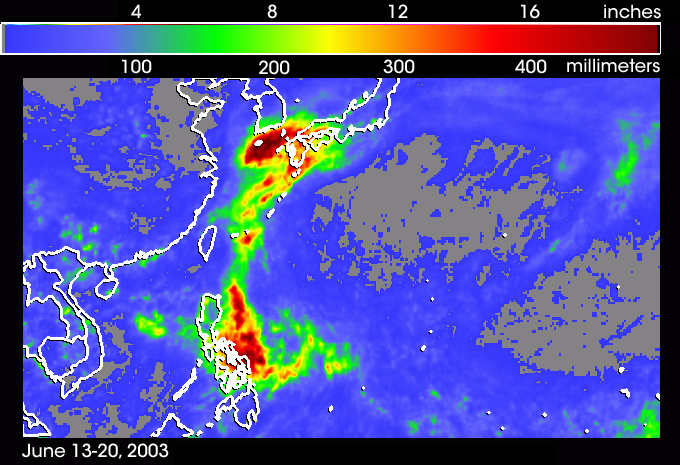
Satellite rainfall estimates from Typhoon Soudelor between June 13 and 20

While Soudelor was moving to the northwest off the east coast of the Philippines, it dropped heavy rainfall, including 300 mm (12 in) in 24 hours in Catarman, Northern Samar. Rainfall in six hours reached 118 mm (4.6 in) at Virac Airport. The rains caused flooding throughout the Philippines, which left thousands of people homeless. Throughout the country, the storm damaged 157 houses and destroyed 94. Soudelor also left crop damage. An estimated 45,400 people were affected by Soudelor. Overall damage was estimated at ₱131 million (2003 Philippine pesos, $2.46 million 2003 USD). (Note: The total was originally reported in Philippine pesos. Total converted via the Oanda Corporation website.) There were 12 deaths, with two missing, as well as two people injured.

In Taiwan, Soudelor dropped heavy rainfall that resulted in flooding and landslides. One of the mudslides covered a 10 km (6.2 mi) section of the Yenhsi Highway between Hsitou and Luku. Road crews were quickly dispatched to the area but had to suspend cleanup efforts due to continuing impacts from Soudelor. Dozens of tour buses carrying tourists who were being evacuated from the mountains were blocked several times by mudslides covering roads. The Sungshan Airport in Taipei was shut down during the morning of June 19 due to unsettled weather produced by the typhoon. The Feitsui Dam increased by 2.5 m (8.2 ft) due to the storm's rainfall, raising it to near peak capacity.

For eight hours, the Japanese island of Iriomote-jima reported gale-force winds, except for during the eye passage of Soudelor. The island reported sustained winds of 108 km/h (67 mph), with gusts to 204 km/h (127 mph). On Ishigaki Island, the storm caused ¥77.9 million (2003 JPY, $655,000 2003 USD) (Note: The total was originally reported in Japanese yen. Total converted via the Oanda Corporation website.) in agriculture damage, mostly from high waves. Soudelor dropped heavy rainfall throughout Japan, peaking at 497 mm (19.6 in) in Kagoshima Prefecture; most of the precipitation fell in about 24 hours. A North Korean cargo ship was stranded off the northwest coast of Japan after being refused entry into the Japanese port of Toyama. During the storm, about 10,000 houses lost power, including 3,400 houses in Okinawa Prefecture. Damage was minor, with only 26 damaged houses, varying from blown off roof tiles to shattered windows. Soudelor injured 21 people in the country, mostly due to falling objects. There were at least 22 landslides nationwide. Four bridges along the Yoshino River were flooded during the storm.

In South Korea, Soudelor dropped about 500 mm (20 in) of rainfall at Hallasan in Jeju Province in South Korea. The storm also caused 4 m (13 ft) seas. Typhoon Soudelor killed two people in South Korea and caused $12.1 million in damages.

== See also ==
- Tropical cyclones in 2003
- Weather of 2003
- Other tropical cyclones named Soudelor
- Other tropical cyclones named Egay
