= List of storms named Nangka =

The name Nangka (Malay: nangka, [ˈnaŋ.ka]) has been used for five tropical cyclones in the western North Pacific Ocean. The name was contributed by Malaysia and means jackfruit (Artocarpus heterophyllus) in Malay.

- Severe Tropical Storm Nangka (2003) (T0305, 06W, Dodong) - tracked well east of Japan.
- Tropical Storm Nangka (2009) (T0904, 04W, Feria) - traversed the Philippines and then made its final landfall in Guangdong, China.
- Typhoon Nangka (2015) (T1511, 11W) - a powerful Category 4 super typhoon that affected the Mariana Islands and Japan.
- Tropical Storm Nangka (2020) (T2016, 18W, Nika) - affected Hainan, China and Vietnam; also the wettest tropical cyclone in the Western Pacific
- Tropical Storm Nangka (2026) (T2617, 16W) - weak and short-lived storm that stayed out to sea

Preceded by Peilou	Pacific typhoon season names Nangka	Succeeded by Saudel
