= List of storms named Soudelor =

The name Soudelor (Pohnpeian: Sau Deleur) has been used to name three tropical cyclones in the northwestern Pacific Ocean. The name was contributed by the Federated States of Micronesia and refers to a legendary chief of the ancient Saudeleur Dynasty in Pohnpei.

- Typhoon Soudelor (2003) (T0306, 07W, Egay) – Category 4 typhoon that approached the Philippines, Taiwan and South Korea
- Tropical Storm Soudelor (2009) (T0905, 05W, Gorio) – weak storm that struck southern China
- Typhoon Soudelor (2015) (T1513, 13W, Hanna) – Category 5 super typhoon that triggered severe impacts in the Northern Mariana Islands, Taiwan, and eastern China

The name Soudelor was retired from the Western Pacific naming lists after the 2015 season and replaced with Saudel, which refers to a title of Chief Soudelor's trusted guard or soldier.
