= List of storms named Saudel =

The name Saudel (Pohnpeian: Saudel, [sʲɐutel]) has been used to name two tropical cyclones in the northwestern Pacific Ocean. The name was contributed by the Federated States of Micronesia and refers to a title of Chief Saudeleur's trusted guard or soldier in Pohnpeian. It replaced the name Soudelor after it was retired following the 2015 Pacific typhoon season.

- Typhoon Saudel (2020) (T2017, 19W, Pepito) – Category 1 typhoon that affected the Philippines, China and Vietnam
- Typhoon Saudel (2026) (T2618, 17W, Obet) – A Category 4 typhoon that affected Japan, China, and Taiwan

Preceded by Nangka	Pacific typhoon season names Saudel	Succeeded by Narra
