= Typhoon Chan-hom (2015) =

Pacific typhoon in 2015

Typhoon Chan-hom (Falcon)
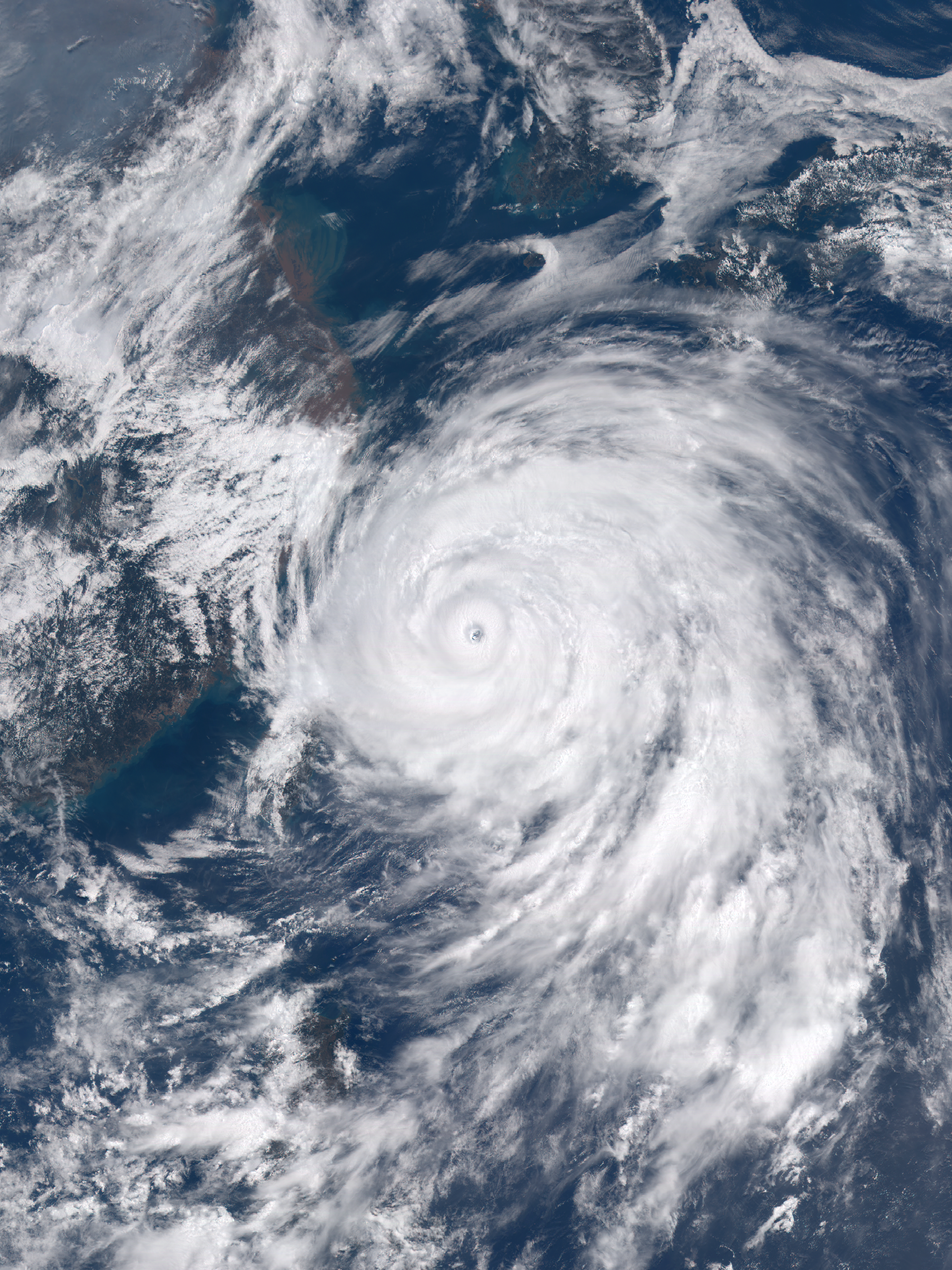
- Typhoon Chan-hom at peak intensity on July 10

Meteorological history
- Formed: June 29, 2015
- Dissipated: July 13, 2015

Very strong typhoon
- 10-minute sustained (JMA)
- Highest winds: 165 km/h (105 mph)
- Lowest pressure: 935 hPa (mbar); 27.61 inHg

Category 4-equivalent typhoon
- 1-minute sustained (SSHWS/JTWC)
- Highest winds: 220 km/h (140 mph)
- Lowest pressure: 933 hPa (mbar); 27.55 inHg

Overall effects
- Fatalities: 18
- Damage: $1.59 billion (2015 USD)
- Areas affected: Guam, Northern Mariana Islands, Philippines, Japan, Taiwan, China, Korea, Russian Far East
- IBTrACS
- Part of the 2015 Pacific typhoon season

Typhoon Chan-hom, (Note: The name Chan-hom (Lao: ຈັນຫອມ, [t͡ɕan˩ hɔːm˩]) was contributed by Laos and refers to a type of fragrant sandalwood (Mansonia gagei) in Lao.) known in the Philippines as Typhoon Falcon, was a large, powerful and long-lived tropical cyclone that affected most countries in the western Pacific basin in early July 2015. The ninth named storm of the 2015 Pacific typhoon season, Chan-hom developed on June 29 from a westerly wind burst that also spawned Tropical Cyclone Raquel in the southern hemisphere. Chan-hom slowly developed while moving to the northwest, aided by warm waters but disrupted by wind shear. The storm meandered near the Northern Marianas Islands, passing over the island of Rota before beginning a steady northwest track. While near the island, the storm dropped heavy rainfall on neighboring Guam, causing flooding and minor power outages. Chan-hom intensified into a typhoon on July 7, and two days later passed between the Japanese islands of Okinawa and Miyako-jima. There, strong winds left 42,000 people without power, while 27 people were injured. Around that time, the storm caused a surge in the monsoon trough, in conjunction with Tropical Storm Linfa, which caused flooding and killed 16 people in the Philippines.

After passing by Okinawa, the typhoon reached peak winds of 165 km/h (103 mph), according to the Japan Meteorological Agency. It passed north of Taiwan, where it brought beneficial rainfall that replenished reservoirs. On July 11, Chan-hom became the strongest typhoon to make landfall in the Chinese province of Zhejiang in the month of July. About 1.1 million people were evacuated ahead of the storm, and across the country, the storm left ¥9.84 billion (US$1.58 billion) in damage, as well as one death. Later, the storm turned to the northeast toward the Korean Peninsula. Jeju Island offshore South Korea recorded 1,250 mm (49 in) of rainfall, and one person died due to a thunderstorm in the country. On July 12, the storm struck the Ongjin peninsula in North Korea, and became an extratropical cyclone shortly thereafter. The remnants later caused flooding and power outages in the Russian Far East.

== Meteorological history ==
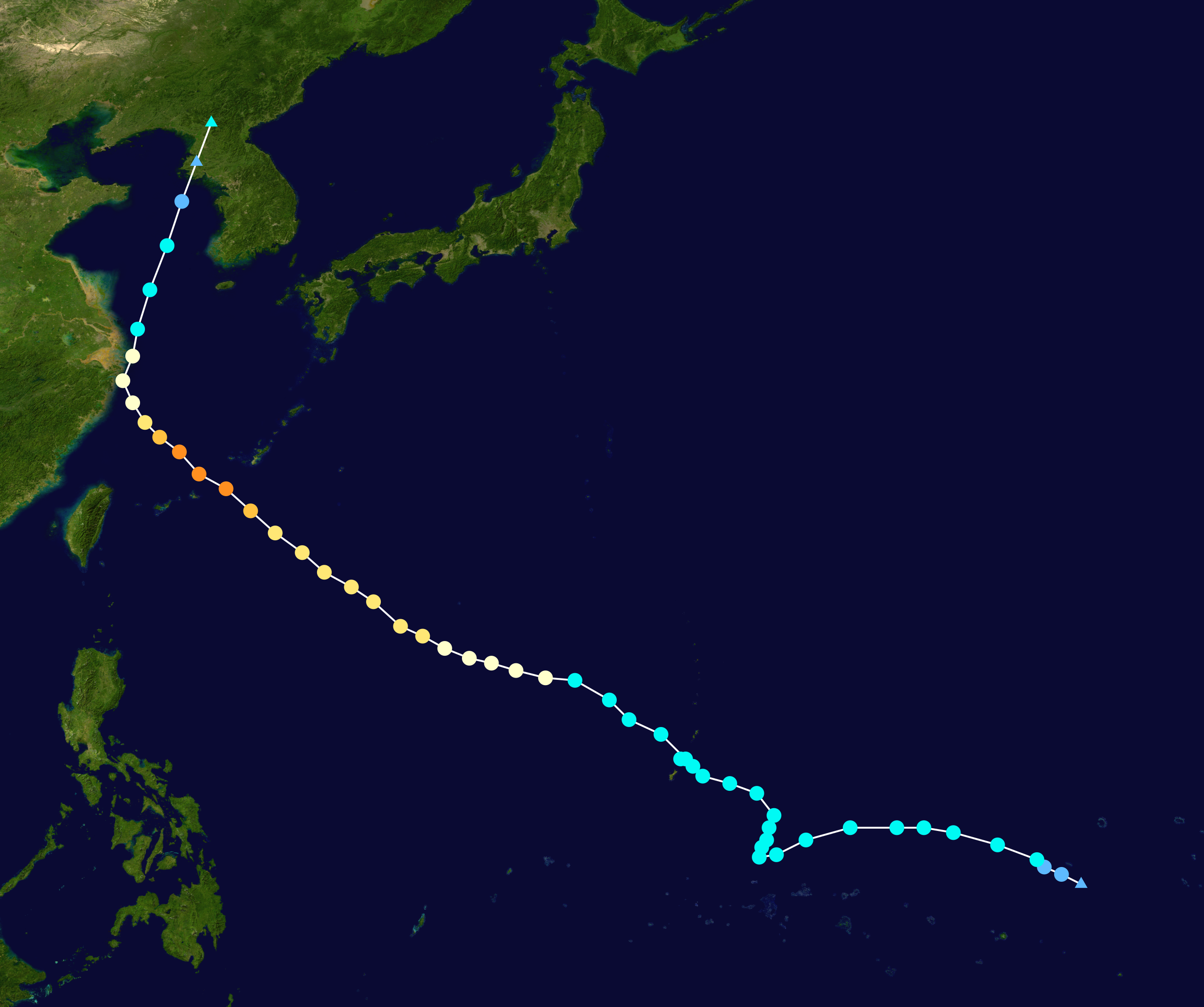
Map plotting the storm's track and intensity, according to the Saffir–Simpson scale Map key Saffir–Simpson scale Tropical depression (≤38 mph, ≤62 km/h) Tropical storm (39–73 mph, 63–118 km/h) Category 1 (74–95 mph, 119–153 km/h) Category 2 (96–110 mph, 154–177 km/h) Category 3 (111–129 mph, 178–208 km/h) Category 4 (130–156 mph, 209–251 km/h) Category 5 (≥157 mph, ≥252 km/h) Unknown Storm type Tropical cyclone Subtropical cyclone Extratropical cyclone, remnant low, tropical disturbance, or monsoon depression

During June 2015, a near record strength pulse in the Madden–Julian oscillation, lead to a period of significant weather across the Western Pacific. This significant weather included a major westerly wind burst during late June, which caused a set of twin tropical cyclones to develop. The first tropical cyclone developed in the Southern Hemisphere during June 28, before it later developed into Tropical Cyclone Raquel during June 30. The second tropical cyclone was first noted by the United States Joint Typhoon Warning Center (JTWC) as a tropical disturbance during June 25, while it was located about 345 km (215 mi) to the south-southeast of Pohnpei State in the Federated States of Micronesia. (Note: The Joint Typhoon Warning Center is a joint United States Navy – United States Air Force task force that issues tropical cyclone warnings for the Pacific and Indian Oceans.)

Drifting generally northward, the disturbance slowly organized within a region of low to moderate wind shear and favorable outflow aloft. The circulation was enhanced by a surge of westerly winds to the south. At 06:00 UTC on June 29, the Japan Meteorological Agency (JMA) (Note: The Japan Meteorological Agency is the official Regional Specialized Meteorological Center for the western Pacific Ocean.) classified the system as a tropical depression. Following further organization, the JTWC issued a Tropical Cyclone Formation Alert that day at 22:30 UTC with the system located about 345 km (214 mi) northeast of Pohnpei. Convection steadily deepened over the center and banding features began consolidating around the periphery. On June 30, the JMA upgraded the cyclone to Tropical Storm Chan-hom. The JTWC assessed Chan-hom to be slightly weaker at this time, initiating it as a tropical depression.

Situated along the southern periphery of a subtropical ridge, Chan-hom moved steadily to the west. Upper-level ventilation allowed for growth of the cyclone, but moderate wind shear displaced the center from the deepest convection for much of July 1. That day, the JMA upgraded the system to a severe tropical storm. Early on July 2, the large circulation of Chan-hom absorbed a smaller disturbance to its southeast, and the storm turned to the west-southwest. Dvorak satellite classifications indicated that the system reached typhoon intensity following an expansion of the central dense overcast; the JTWC classified Chan-hom as such by 15:00 UTC, although the JMA maintained it as a severe tropical storm. Shortly thereafter, strong wind shear from a tropical upper tropospheric trough (TUTT) cell to the northeast dramatically weakened the storm. Convection was stripped away from Chan-hom's center and the storm's forward motion abruptly slowed. Alongside the shear, subsidence over the cyclone, a trough to the north, and a remnant vortex to the northeast all served to suppress convection. By 12:00 UTC on July 3, Chan-hom had weakened to a tropical storm with winds of 85 km/h (53 mph).

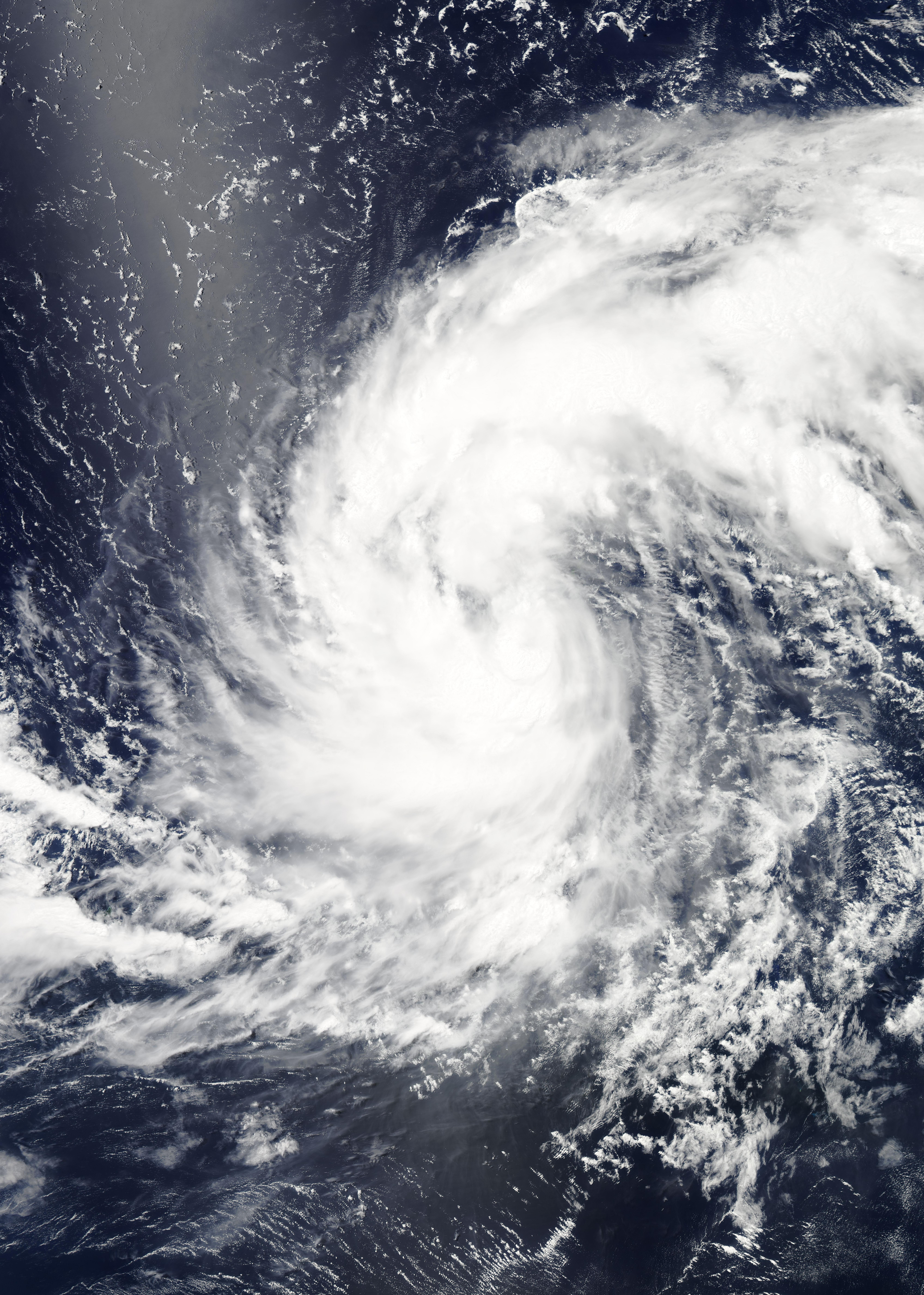
Tropical Storm Chan-hom over the Mariana Islands on July 5

Coinciding with Chan-hom's abrupt collapse on July 3, the system turned northeast as it entered a weakness in the steering ridge. Later that day, the broad circulation turned north-northwest. Wind shear eased early on July 4 as the TUTT cell retreated to the north and the subtropical ridge steadily re-established itself. Convection started redeveloping over the tropical storm. Late on July 4 into July 5, the center of Chan-hom skirted the southern coast of Rota in the Mariana Islands. While near the island, Chan-hom executed an unusual counter-clockwise loop owing to interaction with a monsoon trough. Once clear of the Mariana Islands, steady development ensued owing to low wind shear and good outflow. Early on July 7, Chan-hom attained typhoon intensity according to the JMA, following to a burst in central convection. Microwave satellite imagery indicated the formation of an eye as convection deepened and banding features tightened around the circulation.

On July 7, the typhoon entered the Philippine area of Responsibility and was assigned the local name Falcon. Chan-hom's eye briefly improved in structure before entering a state of flux and collapsing later that day; convection on the northern side of the storm diminished simultaneously. The 65 km (40 mi) wide eye soon re-established itself and slowly contracted to a diameter of 40 km (25 mi) by July 8. A large storm, gale-force winds extended 445 km (277 mi) from Chan-hom's center on July 9. Late on July 9 into July 10, Chan-hom passed between the Japanese islands of Okinawa and Miyako-jima. The typhoon reached its peak strength during this time with estimated winds of 165 km/h (103 mph) and a barometric pressure of 935 mbar (hPa; 27.61 inHg). Featuring multiple intense feeder bands and a well-defined 27 km (17 mi) eye, the JTWC assessed Chan-hom to have peaked as a Category 4-equivalent typhoon on the Saffir–Simpson hurricane wind scale with one-minute sustained winds of 220 km/h (140 mph).

An eyewall replacement cycle and weakening convection along the northern side resulted in steady weakening starting on July 10. Increasing wind shear prevented the system from reorganizing as it neared East China. Early on July 11, the typhoon reached the southwestern edge of the subtropical ridge and began turning to the north and later north-northeast. Chan-hom made landfall in Zhoushan, Zhejiang, or roughly 140 km (87 mi) south-southeast of Shanghai, around 08:40 UTC. The JMA assessed the storm to have had winds of 140 km/h (87 mph) while the JTWC estimated one-minute sustained winds at 155 km/h (96 mph). Based on the JTWC estimate, Chan-hom was the strongest typhoon to pass within 160 km (99 mi) of Shanghai in at least 35 years, and it was the strongest landfall in Zhejiang in the month of July since recordkeeping began in 1949. Thereafter the storm accelerated north-northeast and moved over the cool waters of the Yellow Sea, prompting further degradation of its structure. Chan-hom weakened below typhoon-force around 18:00 UTC on July 11. The system's low-level center completely exposed on July 12 as it approached the Korean Peninsula. Around 18:00 UTC, Chan-hom moved ashore on the Ongjin peninsula in North Korea, southwest of the capital Pyongyang, with winds of 85 km/h (53 mph). By 00:00 UTC on July 13 the system transitioned into an extratropical cyclone while retaining gale-force winds, and six hours later the system dissipated over north-central North Korea.

== Preparations and impact ==
=== China ===
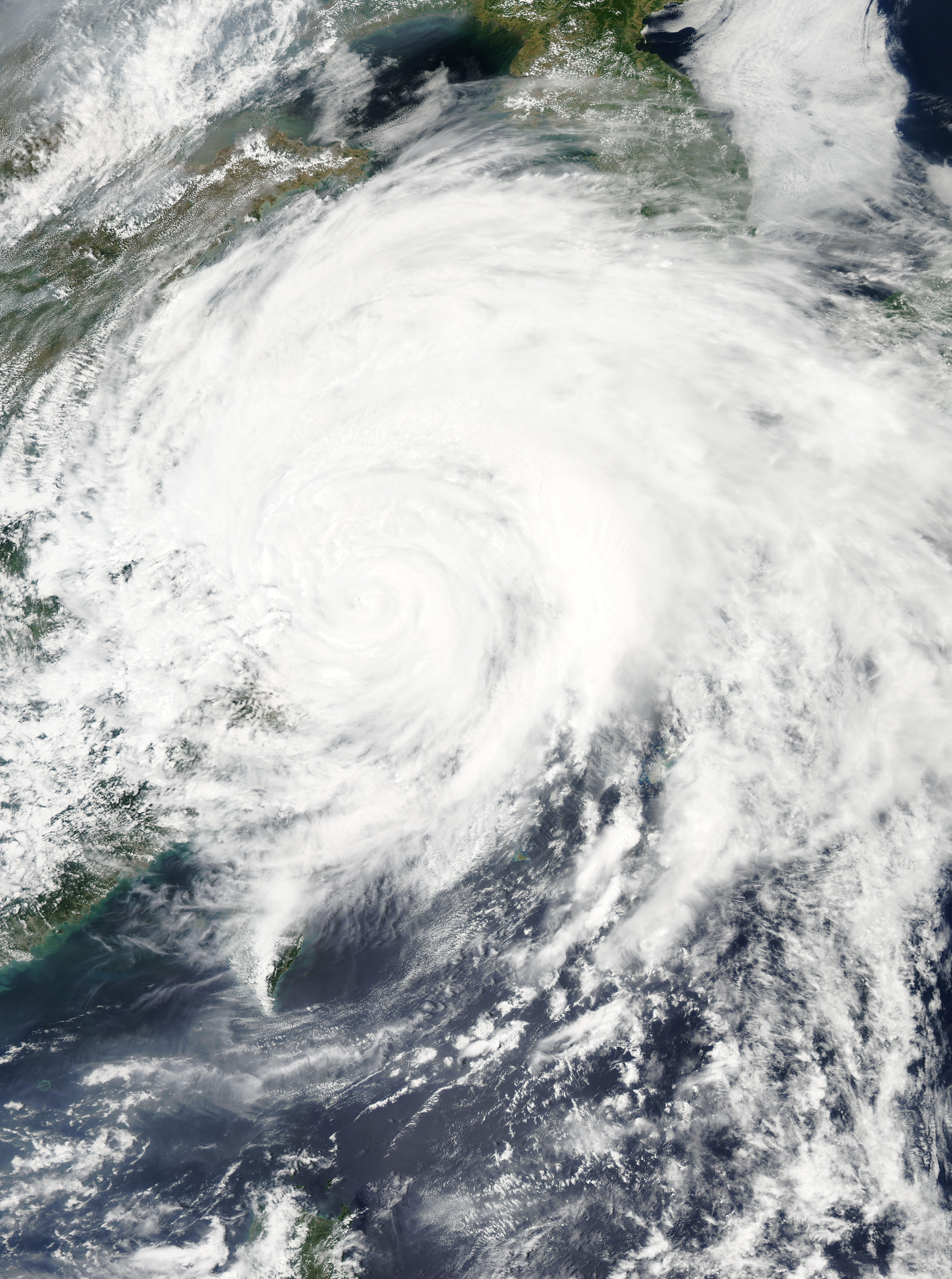
Typhoon Chan-hom hours before making landfall in China on July 11

Due to the typhoon, about 1.1 million people evacuated from areas along the coast. Nearly 30,000 ships were called back to port, and 600 flights were canceled within the area. Over 100 train rides were also canceled, and portions of the Shanghai Metro was shut down. The storm caused a concert for Chinese singer Wang Feng to be canceled.

While moving over eastern China, Chan-hom produced sustained winds of 119 km/h (74 mph) and gusts to 177 km/h (110 mph), both at a station south of Shanghai called Shipu. Shanghai Pudong International Airport recorded wind gusts of 90 km/h (56 mph). Gusts were strongest along the coast and along offshore islands. Rainfall from the storm peaked at 531 mm (20.9 in) in Yuyao, Ninghai, and Xiangshan, all parts of Ningbo city within Zhejiang. The rains caused widespread flooding in eastern China; 11 rivers in Zhejiang surpassed the warning level of 1.91 m (6.3 ft). The storm produced high waves from Fujian to Jiangsu provinces, reaching five storeys high in Wenling, washing fish ashore and flooding the coast.

Winds from Chan-hom were strong enough to knock down street signs across Zhejiang, as well as destroying an unoccupied building in Cixi City. The storm's heavy rainfall caused a landslide in Ningbo and necessitated flood gates to be opened. Also in the city, storm rains caused a hotel roof to collapse, killing one person and injuring two. Throughout Zhejiang, Chan-hom wrecked 700 homes and damaged another 1,400. In neighboring Jiangsu, 300 homes were damaged or destroyed, causing ¥120 million (US$19.3 million) in economic losses. The storm wrecked greenhouses and irrigation systems while also damaging crops. Storm impacts mostly affected agriculture and transportation in the country; over 200,000 ha (490,000 acres) of crop fields were impacted. In the Nanhui District of Shanghai, 20% of peaches and 40% of pears were lost after being damaged by the storm's winds. In Shanghai, the winds knocked down over 3,000 trees. The high agriculture damage – estimated at ¥3.62 billion (US$583 million) – was mostly due to the typhoon's concurrence with the local harvesting of vegetables and melons. Overall, Chan-hom affected 3.9 million people in eastern China, causing about ¥9.84 billion (US$1.58 billion) in damage.

=== Elsewhere ===
Before the storm affected the Marianas Islands, the National Weather Service issued a typhoon watch and tropical storm warning for Guam and Rota, as well as a typhoon warning for Tinian, and Saipan. The United States Department of Defense issued a Condition of Readiness 3. While looping near Rota, Chan-hom produced gusts of 60 km/h (37 mph). On the other side of the Rota Channel, Andersen Air Force Base on northern Guam recorded wind gusts of 117 km/h (73 mph). Rainfall on the island totaled over 300 mm (12 in), based on radar estimates from the University of Guam, and possibly as high as 410 mm (16 in). On Guam, the storm caused minor power outages and flooding.

Although Chan-hom did not directly affect the Philippines, both Chan-hom and Tropical Storm Linfa enhanced the monsoon for several days, which caused severe flooding throughout the country. Heavy rains impacted portions of Luzon and the Western Visayas, with various events resulting in five deaths. Four people also went missing when their boat sank amid strong winds off the coast of Pangasinan. A brief tornado caused minor damage in Iba, Zambales. Nearly 34,000 people were affected by the monsoon event, which killed 16 people and caused ₱3.9 million (US$86,000) in agricultural losses.

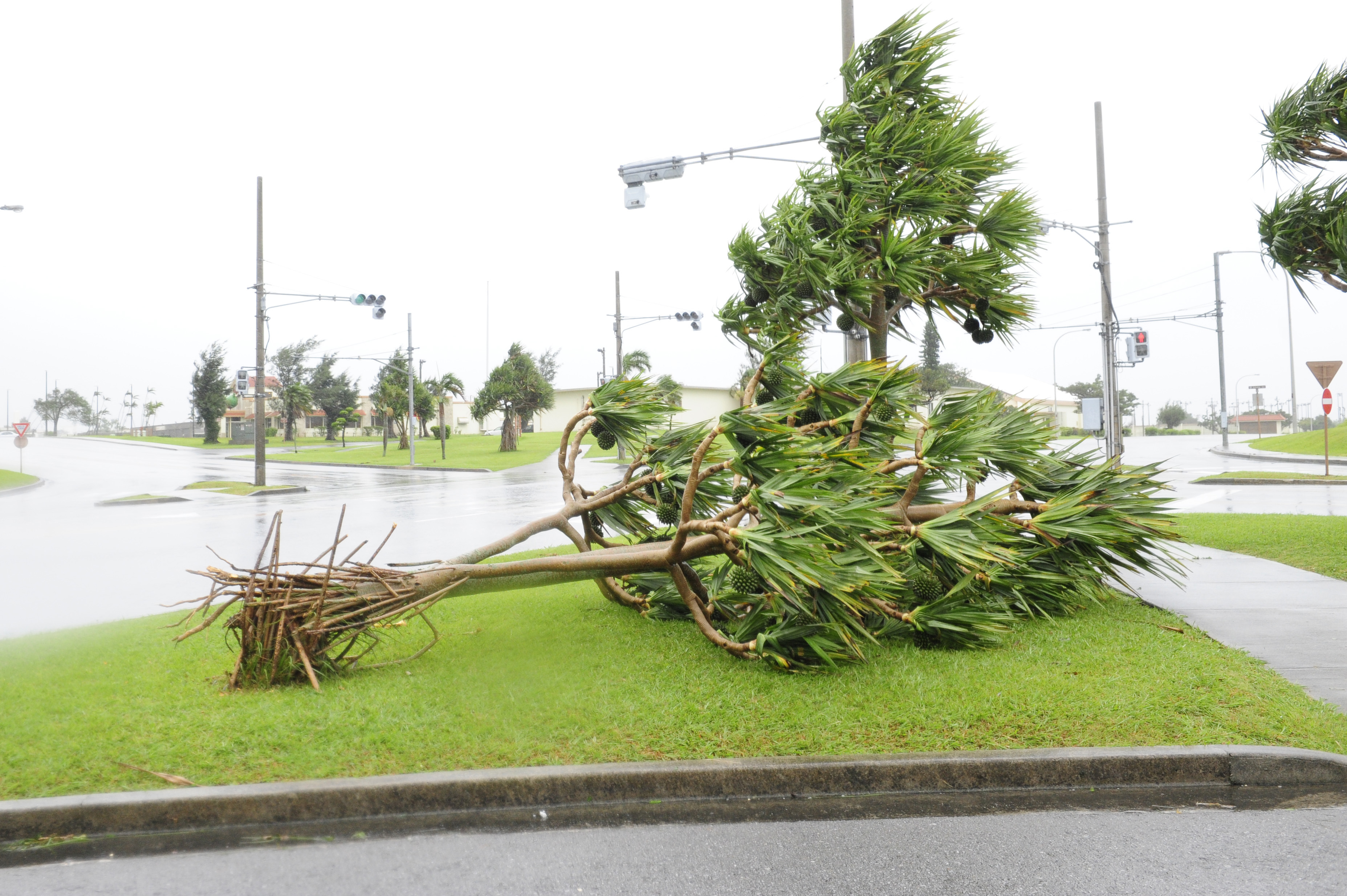
Fallen trees in Kadena Air Base, Japan

On July 9, the outer rainbands of Chan-hom began affecting the Japanese island of Okinawa. Between July 9 and 10, 326 flights were canceled at Naha Airport, affecting more than 32,000 people. A total of 176 people sought refuge in public shelters. American military bases on the island were placed under Condition of Readiness 1, the highest level. Early on July 10, a station near the southern end of Okinawa recorded peak wind gusts of 179.6 km/h (111.6 mph), along with sustained winds of 118.8 km/h (73.8 mph). Strong winds affected other Japanese islands in the region, and Miyako-jima recorded peak gusts of 118.8 km/h (73.8 mph). The storm dropped heavy rainfall, peaking at 230 mm (9.1 in) in Nago, Okinawa. At the height of the storm, 42,000 people lost power across Okinawa Prefecture. The storm injured 27 people in Okinawa, three seriously. Two buildings were damaged. Agricultural damage across Okinawa reached ¥524 million (US$4.27 million), most of which was sustained by the mango crop.

Passing north of Taiwan, the threat of Chan-hom caused the Taiwan Stock Exchange and other public buildings to close, as well as canceling several flights. The storm brought ultimately heavy rainfall, reaching 388.5 mm (15.30 in) in Taipei. The Shihmen Dam, which had dropped to 55% capacity before the storm, rose to 90.26% of its capacity due to the storm's rains.

In South Korea, 574 flights were canceled and 163 boats were forced to remain at port. The large circulation of the storm dropped heavy rainfall throughout the Korean Peninsula, beneficial in easing drought conditions. Notably, Mount Halla on the offshore Jeju Island recorded 1,250 mm (49 in) of rainfall during Chan-hon's passage. Wind gusts reached 76 km/h (47 mph) in Muan County in southwestern South Korea. Thunderstorms killed one person in the country. Losses in South Jeolla Province were confirmed to be ₩4.8 billion (US$4.22 million). When Chan-hom made landfall along North Korea, winds were generally less than 40 km/h (25 mph), with gusts reaching up to 54 km/h (34 mph). The storm dropped heavy rainfall, reaching over 300 mm (12 in) in North Hamgyong Province along the east coast. Flooding was limited, as most of the country received about 102 mm (4.0 in) of rainfall from the storm.

The remnants of Chan-hom later impacted southern areas of Khabarovsk Krai, producing heavy rain and high winds, peaking at 79 km/h (49 mph). The winds downed numerous trees, some of which fell on cars, and uprooted tombs in a graveyard in Khabarovsk. The towns of Bikin, Sovetskaya Gavan, and Vyazma, saw 40 to 80 mm (1.6 to 3.1 in) of rain or roughly 60–70 percent of their average monthly precipitation for July during the storm's passage. Flooding affected dozens of homes in the region as rivers rose by 1 to 2 m (3.3 to 6.6 ft). Power and telephone service was lost in 34 communities. Ferry service between Vanino and Kholmsk was suspended, temporarily stranding 1,300 passengers. Damages in Khabarovsk Krai reached ₽87 million (US$1.54 million).

== See also ==
- Weather of 2015
- Tropical cyclones in 2015
- Typhoon Abe (1990)
- Typhoon Winnie (1997)
- Typhoon Saomai (2006)
- Typhoon Haikui (2012)
- Tropical Storm Ampil (2018)
- Typhoon Bavi (2026)
