= Tropical Storm Linfa (2015) =

Pacific typhoon in 2015

Severe Tropical Storm Linfa (Egay)
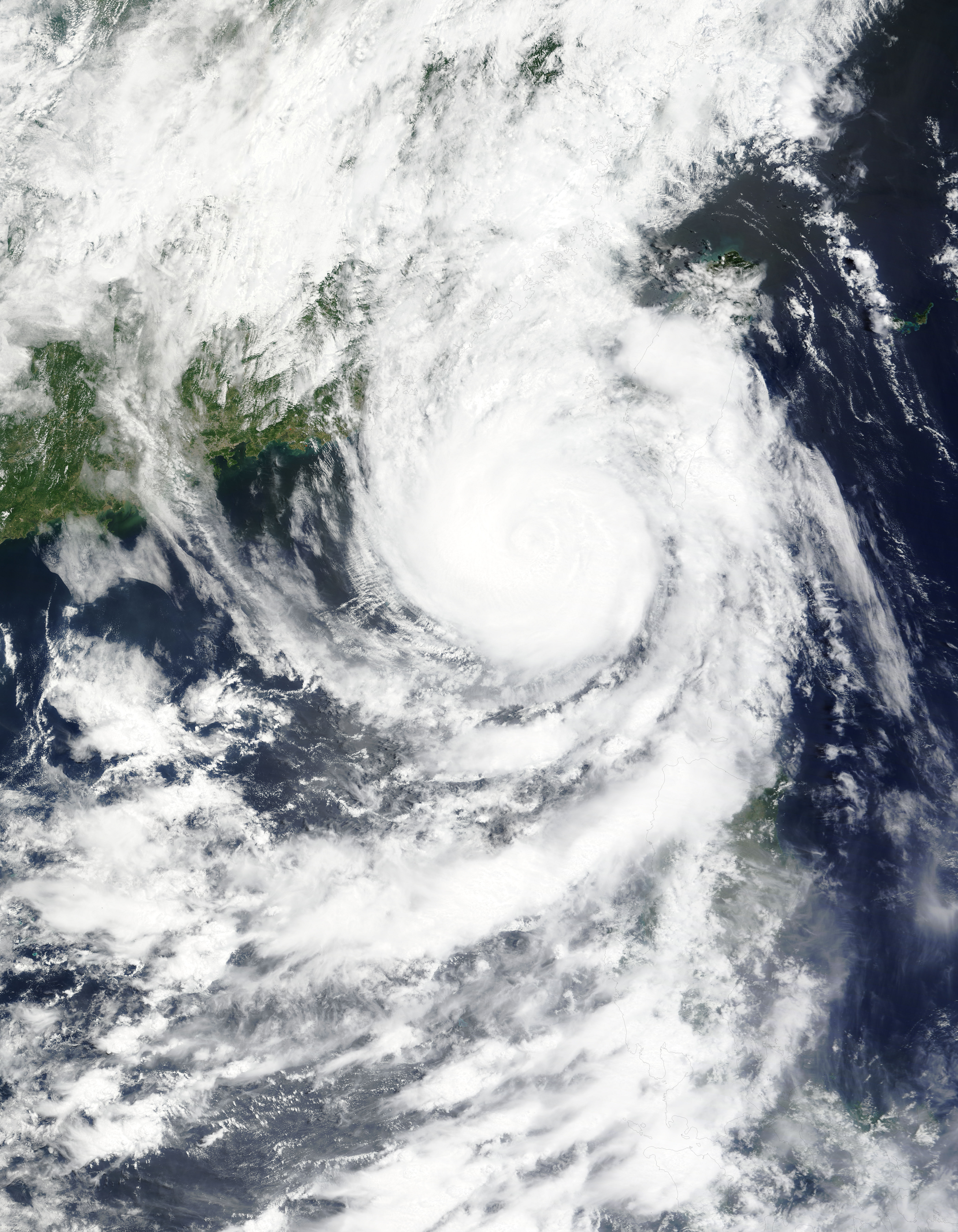
- Tropical Storm Linfa at peak intensity southwest of Taiwan on July 8

Meteorological history
- Formed: July 1, 2015
- Dissipated: July 10, 2015

Severe tropical storm
- 10-minute sustained (JMA)
- Highest winds: 95 km/h (60 mph)
- Lowest pressure: 980 hPa (mbar); 28.94 inHg

Category 1-equivalent typhoon
- 1-minute sustained (SSHWS/JTWC)
- Highest winds: 140 km/h (85 mph)
- Lowest pressure: 967 hPa (mbar); 28.56 inHg

Overall effects
- Fatalities: 1 total
- Damage: $285 million (2015 USD)
- Areas affected: Philippines, Taiwan, China, Vietnam
- IBTrACS
- Part of the 2015 Pacific typhoon season

Severe Tropical Storm Linfa, (Note: The name Linfa (Cantonese: 蓮花; lin4 faa1, [liːn˨˩ faː˥]) was contributed by Macau and means lotus (Nelumbo nucifera) in Cantonese.) known in the Philippines as Severe Tropical Storm Egay, was a tropical cyclone that affected the northern Philippines, Taiwan and southern China in early July 2015. The tenth named storm of the annual typhoon season, Linfa developed on July 1 over in the Philippine Sea. It moved erratically westward toward the Philippines, eventually striking the island of Luzon on July 4. Linfa weakened across the island, but reorganized over the South China Sea. It turned northward and strengthened to near typhoon intensity, or winds of 120 km/h (75 mph), but weakened as it curved to the northwest toward southern China. On July 9, the storm made landfall along the Chinese province of Guangdong, dissipating the next day west of Hong Kong.

Interacting with the monsoon, Linfa brought heavy rainfall across much of the Philippines for several days, causing flooding and landslides that resulted in traffic accidents and power outages. Across Luzon, Linfa damaged 198 houses and destroyed another seven, causing ₱214.65 million (US$4.76 million) in damage. The storm briefly threatened Taiwan, prompting warnings and restricted ferry travel. Over China, Linfa produced heavy rainfall and gusty winds that wrecked 288 homes. Damage in the country totaled ¥1.74 billion (US$280 million), and there was one death.

== Meteorological history ==
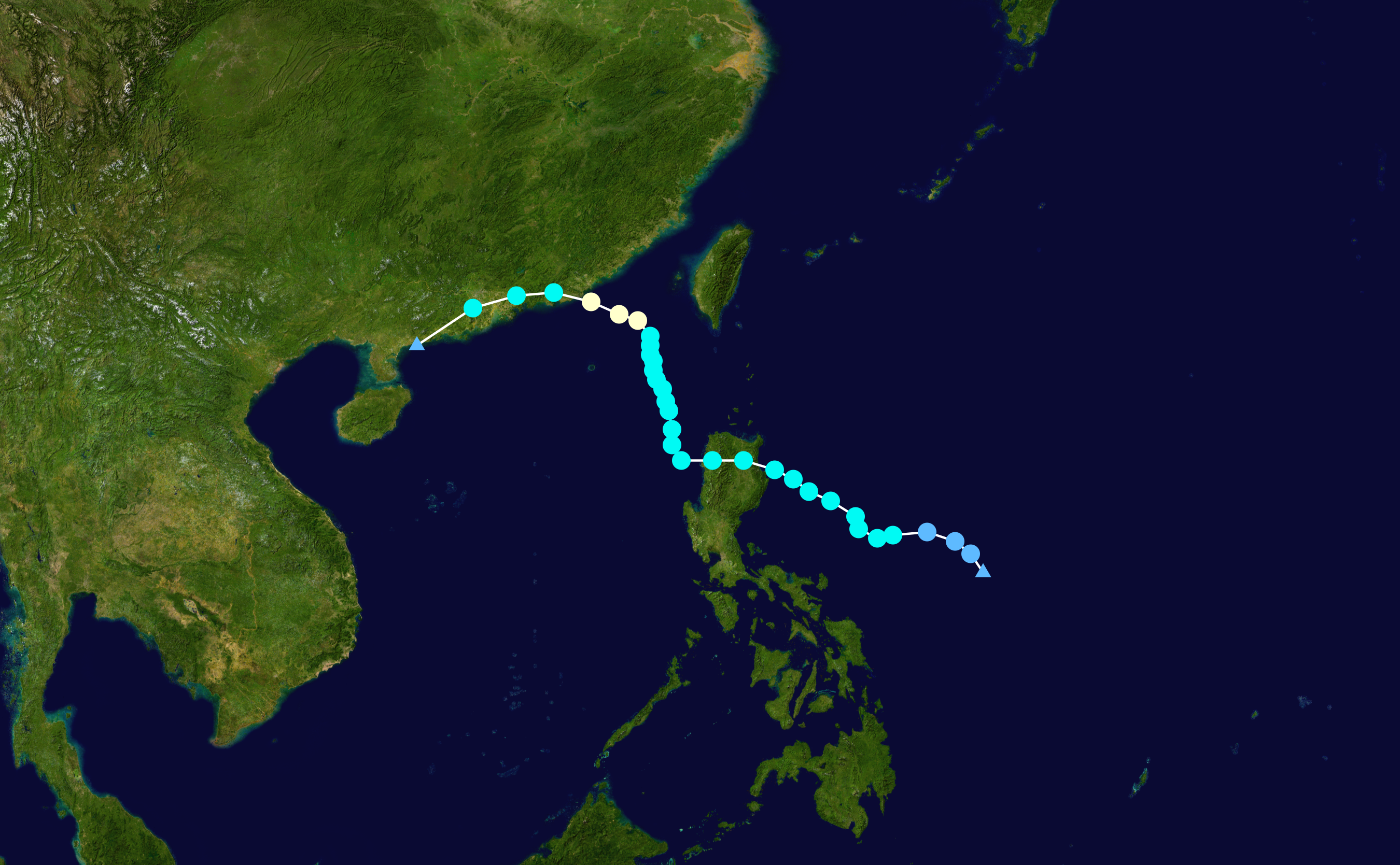
Map plotting the storm's track and intensity, according to the Saffir–Simpson scale Map key Saffir–Simpson scale Tropical depression (≤38 mph, ≤62 km/h) Tropical storm (39–73 mph, 63–118 km/h) Category 1 (74–95 mph, 119–153 km/h) Category 2 (96–110 mph, 154–177 km/h) Category 3 (111–129 mph, 178–208 km/h) Category 4 (130–156 mph, 209–251 km/h) Category 5 (≥157 mph, ≥252 km/h) Unknown Storm type Tropical cyclone Subtropical cyclone Extratropical cyclone, remnant low, tropical disturbance, or monsoon depression

Toward the end of June, a westerly wind burst moved across the western Pacific Ocean, spawning Typhoon Chan-hom as well as the storm that would become Linfa. On July 1, a large area of convection persisted east of the Philippines, with an associated circulation exposed due to moderate wind shear. At 06:00 UTC that day, the Joint Typhoon Warning Center (JTWC) assessed a low probability of tropical cyclogenesis over the subsequent 24 hours. However, the system quickly organized, prompting the JTWC to issue a tropical cyclone formation alert later that day, indicating that a storm would likely form imminently. At 18:00 UTC on July 1, the Japan Meteorological Agency (JMA) estimated that a tropical depression developed about 500 km (310 mi) east-northeast of the Philippine island of Samar. Early the next day, the JTWC classified the system as Tropical Depression 10W, based on the organization of the rainbands about the center. PAGASA – the Philippines' weather agency – also began monitoring the system, giving it the local name Egay.

With the subtropical ridge to the northeast, the nascent system moved northwestward initially. Despite persistent shear dislocating the convection, the JMA upgraded the system to a tropical storm at 12:00 UTC on July 2, naming it Linfa. The storm slowly intensified, amplified by good outflow to the south and the presence of warm water temperatures. On July 3, Linfa's track briefly shifted to the southwest, by which time the convective structure had evolved into a central dense overcast. There was uncertainty in the storm's future as it approached the Philippines. This was due to potential interaction with Typhoon Chan-hom to the northeast, and differences in storm models whether an approaching trough would turn Linfa to the east or the west.

After turning back to the northwest, the convection around Linfa became even more symmetrical, although the circulation became slightly elongated. At 06:00 UTC on July 4, the storm reached a preliminary peak intensity, with 10 minute sustained winds of 85 km/h (53 mph) according to the JMA. As Linfa neared the northern Philippines, the bulk of the convection was shifted to the southern periphery, due to the continued wind shear. Late on July 4, the center of Linfa made landfall over Palanan, Isabela, on the island of Luzon. Moving westward across the island, the circulation became disorganized as the core convection diminished. By late on July 5, Linfa emerged into the South China Sea. Once over open waters, Linfa began moving to the north-northwest, still moving around the subtropical ridge, and it was expected to move over Taiwan. The circulation remained well-defined but exposed, with the deep convection displaced to the south. With the isolated thunderstorms and unfavorable wind shear, the JTWC noted the potential for the circulation to dissipate over open waters. By July 7, easing wind shear allowed the convection to rebuild and for the structure to improve in organization. By that time, the future of the storm was still uncertain, although a turn to the northwest toward China was expected. Also on July 7, PAGASA issued its final bulletin on the storm as Linfa exited their area of responsibility.

More favorable conditions allowed the storm to intensify more on July 8. Around that time, the storm turned more to the northwest due to a ridge exiting China, bringing the storm southwest of western Taiwan. At 00:00 UTC on July 8, the JMA estimated peak 10 minute winds of 95 km/h (59 mph), making it a severe tropical storm. The JTWC assessed further strengthening, upgrading Linfa to typhoon status at 18:00 UTC that day based on a developing well-defined eye. At that time, the agency estimated peak 1 minute winds of 120 km/h (75 mph). Early on July 9, the Hong Kong Observatory (HKO) sent a reconnaissance aircraft into the storm, which measured winds of near hurricane-force, as well as gale-force winds 100 km (62 mi) from the center. As the storm approached the southern China coast, the eye expanded to a diameter of 37 km (23 mi), while the thunderstorms on the northern periphery diminished. Around 03:00 UTC on July 9, Linfa made landfall east of Hong Kong near Lufeng, Guangdong, and it quickly weakened once over land. The storm turned westward, inland and parallel to the southern Chinese coastline. As the thunderstorms diminished, the surface sustained winds continued to drop. At 18:00 UTC on July 9, the JTWC issued their final advisory for Linfa, and shortly after the JMA downgraded the storm to a tropical depression. The system turned to the southwest, dissipating over open waters on July 10 off the coast of Guangdong province.

== Preparations ==
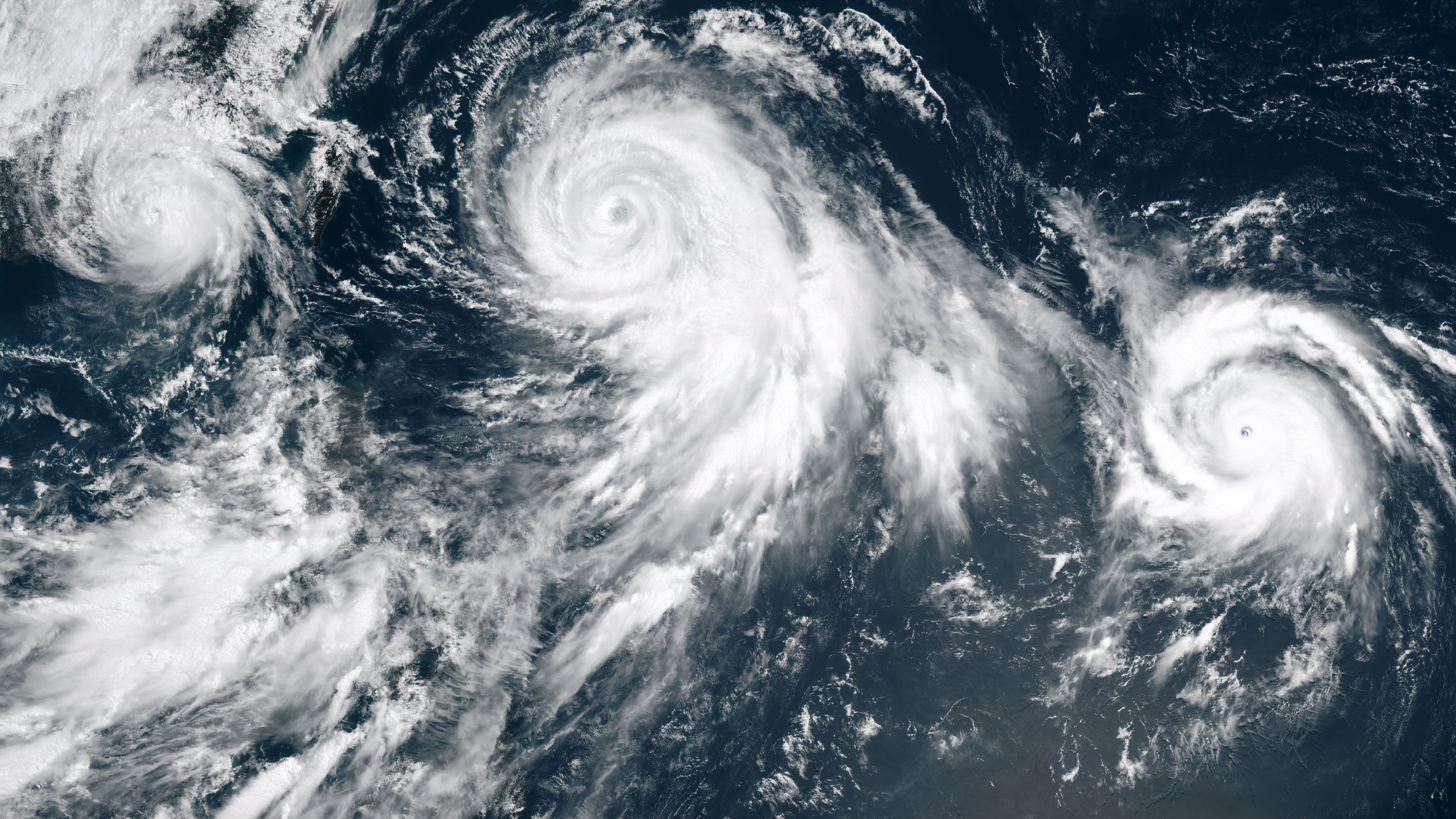
Three simultaneously active typhoons on July 9: (from left to right) Linfa, Chan-hom and Nangka

As Linfa (locally known as Egay) approached closer to the Philippine island of Luzon, PAGASA issued Public Storm Warning Signal (PSWS) #2, expecting gale force-winds in Apayao, Aurora, Cagayan, northern Isabela, Kalinga, and Quirino, including the offshore Babuyan and Calayan islands. A lower PSWS was issued for other portions of Luzon. Ahead of the storm, 45,336 people evacuated in the Philippines, utilizing 31 government shelters and assisted by police officers. Restricted travel by boat stranded 1,147 people during the storm's passage. Due to the enhancement of the southwest monsoon by the storm, all ships in the Port of Manila were ordered to remain in harbor, and 20 flights were cancelled in northern Luzon. La Union province declared a state of calamity on July 6 because of the storm. Road-clearing teams were prepared ahead of the storm.

The threat of the storm prompted officials in Taiwan to issue sea warnings for the island's southern coast, causing ferry service to two offshore islands to be canceled. A hot air balloon festival was canceled in Taitung City. On July 8, the HKO issued a Standby Signal #1 for Hong Kong due to the increased threat from Linfa. On the next day, the agency upgraded it to a Warning Signal #8, indicating that gale-force winds were expected, although it was dropped in 5.5 hours, becoming one of the shortest-lasting such warning. The local government opened 22 shelters, housing 196 people during the storm. The storm caused the Hong Kong International Airport to close, causing 1,020 flights to be canceled. The China Meteorological Administration also issued 14 warnings for mainland China, advising residents on the threat of the storm. Schools were closed in Guangdong due to the storm, while train service was canceled and 10,400 boats returned to port. The Chinese government handled the preparations for Linfa at the same time Typhoon Chan-hom was threatening the country's east coast.

== Impact ==
In its formative stages, Linfa brought light rainfall to Palau and Yap, causing minimal effects. The outskirts of the storm increased winds across eastern Malaysia, which knocked down trees and destroyed the roofs of eight school and several houses. In one of the damaged homes, an 18-month-old baby inside was thrown into a nearby field and suffered injuries.

While moving through the Philippines, Linfa caused flooding and four separate landslides. The storm's heavy rainfall caused water levels to rise in reservoirs, prompting officials to drain some excess waters from the Binga Dam in Benguet province. Schools were closed in Metro Manila for three days due to flooding and landslides. The storm damaged 18 sections of roads, as well as two bridges and an irrigation canal in San Gabriel, La Union. Slick roads and a fallen tree caused a bus accident in Quezon City, injuring ten people. Portions of Luzon lost power during the storm, including the entirety of La Union province, and Bacnotan briefly lost water access. In the Ilocos region, a Chinese fishing vessel docked at Currimao port ran aground after being battered by huge waves. Three days of high waves washed 30 tons of mussels ashore Valladolid, Negros Occidental, prompting officials to use trucks to bury the rotting shells to prevent the spread of disease. Rough waves also disrupted rescue efforts for an unrelated ferry disaster in the country that killed 54. The storm interacted with the monsoon to spawn two tornadoes in Negros Occidental, as well as strong winds that knocked down trees and billboards. Across Luzon, Linfa damaged 198 houses and destroyed another seven. The storm damaged ₱34 million (US$753,000) worth of crops, and total damage reached ₱214.65 million (US$4.76 million). Most of the power outages were repaired within a few days of Linfa's passage. After the storm, officials distributed meals to affected residents.

Linfa was originally forecast to move northwards and make landfall in Taiwan. However, Linfa curved to the west and hit Southern China instead. Only heavy rains and gusty winds were felt in Southern and Central Taiwan.

Moving ashore southern China, Linfa produced wind gusts of 171 km/h (106 mph) in Huilai County, while a station in Lufeng, Guangdong recorded sustained winds of 123 km/h (76 mph). The storm also dropped heavy rainfall in southern China, peaking at 269 mm (10.6 in) in Meizhou. About 370,000 lost power in Shanwei and Shantou. Linfa caused 288 homes to collapse in the country, while 56,000 people were displaced. One person was killed in the country. Damage totaled ¥1.74 billion (US$280 million). Linfa passed about 50 km (31 mi) north of Hong Kong as a weakening storm, producing gusts of around 47 km/h (29 mph). During its passage, the storm produced a storm surge of 0.48 m (1.6 ft) along Waglan Island. Rainfall reached around 40 mm (1.6 in) in the territory. The winds remained fairly weak, knocking down a few trees, both in Hong Kong and nearby Macau.

== See also ==
- Weather of 2015
- Tropical cyclones in 2015
- Other tropical cyclones named Linfa
- Other tropical cyclones named Egay
- Tropical Storm Cimaron (2013)
- Tropical Storm Fung-wong (2014)
- Tropical Storm Nida (2016)
- Tropical Storm Ma-on (2022)
- Typhoon Doksuri (2023) – another typhoon that took a similar track and same name by PAGASA
