= Tropical Storm Fran (1984) =

Atlantic tropical storm in 1984

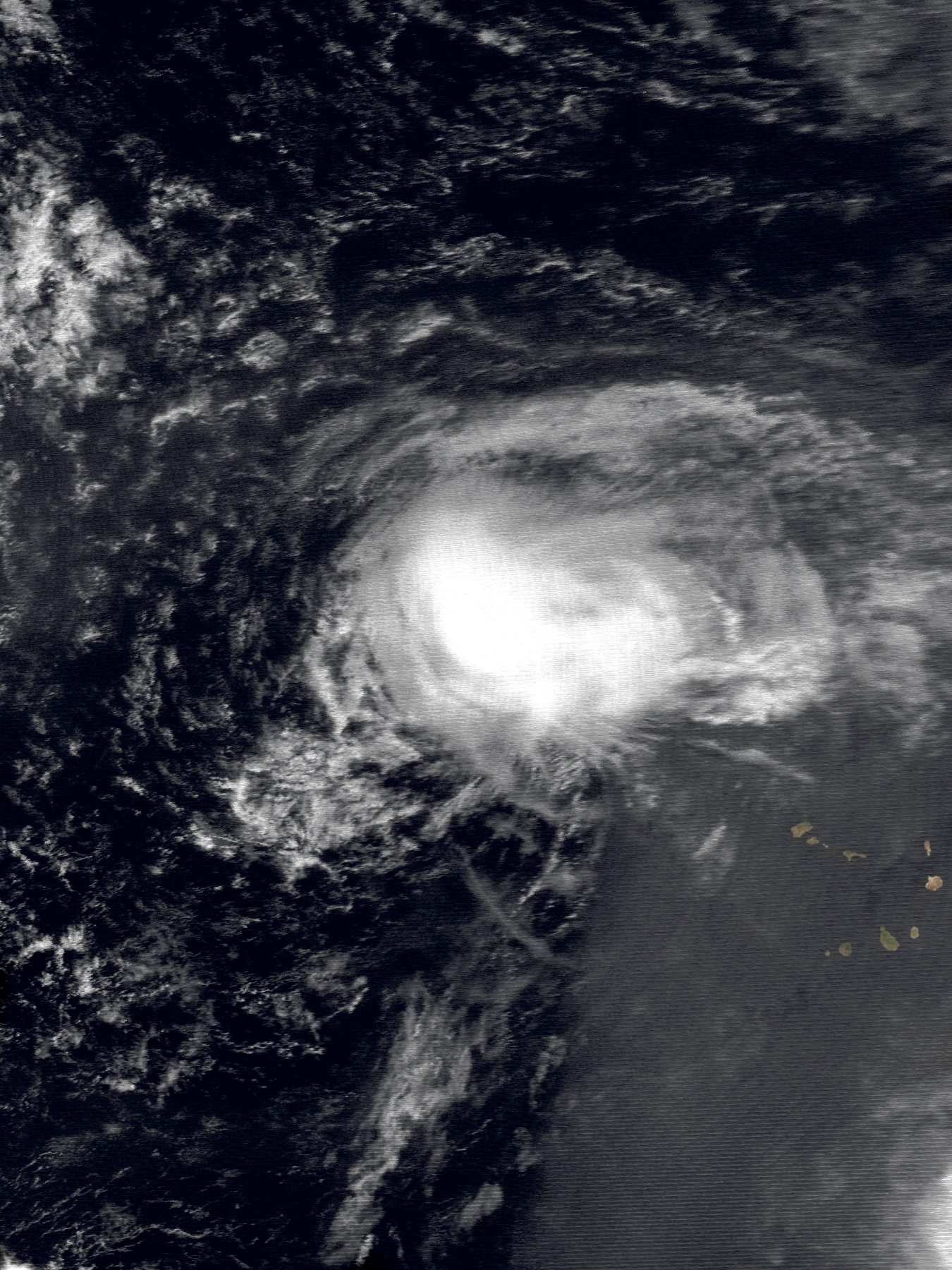
- Tropical storm Fran on September 18

Meteorological history
- Formed: September 15, 1984
- Dissipated: September 20, 1984

Tropical storm
- 1-minute sustained (SSHWS/NWS)
- Highest winds: 65 mph (100 km/h)
- Lowest pressure: 994 mbar (hPa); 29.35 inHg

Overall effects
- Fatalities: 29–32
- Damage: $2.8 million (1984 USD)
- Areas affected: Cape Verde Islands
- IBTrACS
- Part of the 1984 Atlantic hurricane season

Tropical Storm Fran was one of the deadliest tropical cyclones in the history of Cape Verde. The sixth named storm and eleventh tropical cyclone of the 1984 Atlantic hurricane season, Fran developed from a tropical wave near Cape Verde on September 15. It began as a tropical depression and gradually strengthened while tracking westward, remaining south of the Cape Verde archipelago. Late on September 16, the depression intensified into Tropical Storm Fran, shortly before brushing Cape Verde, and then moving further out to sea. The storm approached hurricane status on September 17 and September 18, though it eventually weakened. Beginning on September 19, Fran encountered strong wind shear, which contributed to further weakening. By September 20, Fran dissipated well east of the Lesser Antilles.

While passing southeast of Cape Verde, the storm produced torrential rainfall. At least 1,094 houses were severely damaged due to flooding, which left at least 2,100 people homeless. Significant damage also occurred to roads in the country, which was still in need of repairs as late as January 1985. The hydraulic infrastructure was destroyed on six islands, requiring $1 million (1984 USD) in repairs. In addition, agriculture was extensively damaged, resulting in $1.84 million (1984 USD) in losses to crops. The storm caused no impact outside of Cape Verde. Overall, the storm caused about $2.84 million (1984 USD) in damage and between 29 and 32 fatalities. Several organizations and countries donated to disaster relief funds, which cash amounts alone reaching slightly more than $501,000 (1984 USD).

== Meteorological history ==
Map plotting the storm's track and intensity, according to the Saffir–Simpson scale Map key Saffir–Simpson scale Tropical depression (≤38 mph, ≤62 km/h) Tropical storm (39–73 mph, 63–118 km/h) Category 1 (74–95 mph, 119–153 km/h) Category 2 (96–110 mph, 154–177 km/h) Category 3 (111–129 mph, 178–208 km/h) Category 4 (130–156 mph, 209–251 km/h) Category 5 (≥157 mph, ≥252 km/h) Unknown Storm type Tropical cyclone Subtropical cyclone Extratropical cyclone, remnant low, tropical disturbance, or monsoon depression

A well-defined tropical wave emerged into the Atlantic Ocean from the west coast of Africa on September 14. The system rapidly organized, and at 1200 UTC on September 15, it developed into a tropical depression while located to the southeast of the Cape Verde. Early on September 16, the depression intensified into Tropical Storm Fran, based on intensity estimates via the Dvorak technique. By then, the storm had begun a track to the northwest; Fran then passed near the southernmost islands of Cape Verde. Late on September 17, Fran attained peak intensity with maximum sustained winds of 65 mph (100 km/h) and a minimum barometric pressure of 994 mbar (29.35 inHg). It maintained this intensity for about 24 hours, during which time Fran turned to the west and later to the west-southwest due to high-pressure area located over the northeastern Atlantic.

Operationally, the National Hurricane Center (NHC) did not upgrade the cyclone to Tropical Storm Fran until September 18, after receiving confirmation from satellite imagery and sparse ship reports. The NHC predicted late on September 18 that Fran would slowly strengthen. However, a strong upper-level trough and likely a cutoff low-pressure area instead generated strong wind shear over Fran on September 19. Consequently, the cyclone weakened as deep convection became detached center of the storm, with Fran falling to tropical depression status at 0600 UTC on September 20. The NHC operationally downgraded the storm 10 hours later and predicted that Fran would likely dissipate by the next day. Around 18:00 UTC on September 20, the storm dissipated while located about 1,250 miles (2,010 km) east-northeast of Antigua, with the remnants becoming unidentifiable on September 21.

== Impacts ==
Light winds were reported in Cape Verde; some weather stations recorded winds of 35 miles per hour (56 km/h). As a result, wind damage was minimal. While passing southeast of Cape Verde, Fran dropped torrential rainfall on the islands, which caused significant flooding. The storm caused severe damage to at least 1,094 houses, which left at least 2,100 people homeless. On Santo Antão, São Nicolau, and Santiago, agriculture also suffered losses, totaling to $1.84 million (1984 USD). Fran also caused significant damage to roads, which still required repairs as late as January 1985. The hydraulic infrastructure on Santo Antão, Santiago, São Nicolau, São Vicente, Fogo, and Maio was destroyed and cost about $1 million (1984 USD) to repair. At least 29 people were killed, though some sources claim there were as many as 32 fatalities. Fran is thus the second deadliest tropical cyclone in the history of Cape Verde, behind only Hurricane Debbie in 1961, which caused 60 fatalities after a plane crashed due to weather associated with the storm. Overall, the storm caused at least $2.84 million (1984 USD) in damage. Although extensive impacts occurred due to flooding, rainfall generated by Fran refilled underground water reserves, improving agricultural aspects in Cape Verde, which had been suffering from a drought.

On October 10, 1984, the Government of Cape Verde appealed for international assistance. Emergency relief aid requested included: two-month supply of food for 1,124 families, 1,064 mattresses, 532 kerosene stoves, 2,128 sets of dinner ware, 2,128 mugs, 1,064 cooking pots and pans, 532 water buckets, 2,128 sheets, 1,064 blankets, 2,660 articles of clothing, and building materials for repair of the 1,094 houses. In January 1985, the government of Cape Verde announced that they had made significant progress with relief assistance. However, repairs to roads, infrastructure, and crops were still required. Five organizations contributed cash, including the National Solidarity Movement, the Cape Verde Red Cross, Chinese Red Cross, Oxfam Novib, and Oxfam of the United Kingdom; donations collectively totaled to $172,221 (1984 USD). France, Finland, the Soviet Union, and the United States supplied 4000 tons of cereals, $79,000 (1984 USD) to the Red Cross, $250,000 (1984 USD) for home repairs, 32 packages of medicines, and 17 packages of blankets.

== See also ==
- Other storms of the same name
- List of West Africa hurricanes
- Hurricane Fred (2015)
