= List of West Africa hurricanes =

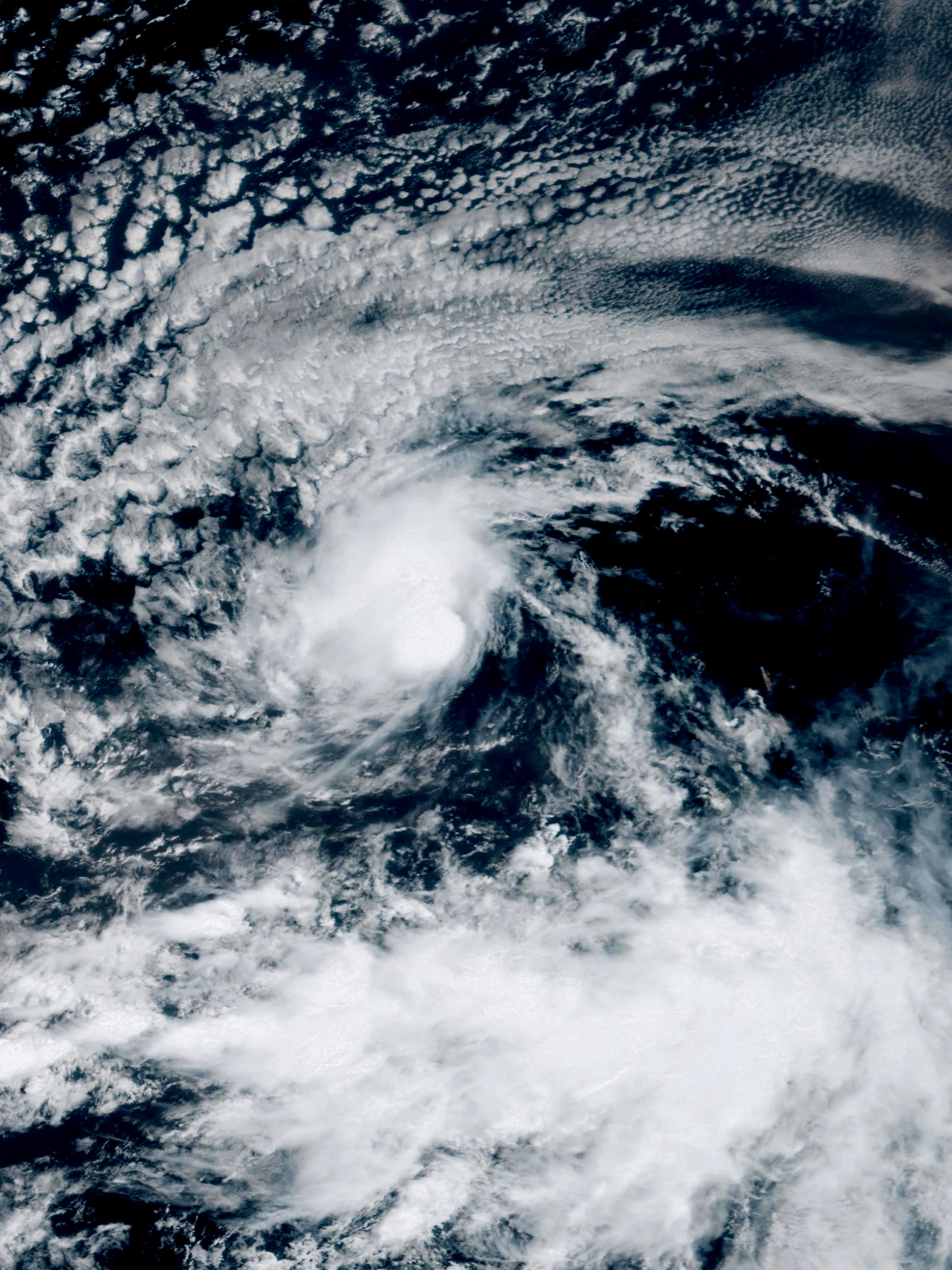
Tropical Storm Erin west-northwest of Cape Verde on August 11, 2025

This list of West Africa hurricanes includes all Atlantic Ocean tropical cyclones that have made landfall on, or directly affected, the Atlantic coast of West Africa or its surrounding islands: the Cape Verde Islands and the Canary Islands. Such cyclones seldom occur as easterly winds carry the storms away from land, and most Atlantic storms that move off the African coast tend to be weak.

== List of tropical cyclones ==
=== 1900–1949 ===
- September 10, 1900: 1900's second hurricane originated as a tropical storm at about 10°N-18.5°W and moved northwestward. The storm rapidly gained strength as it reached hurricane on September 9. The hurricane continued moving northwestward as it bypassed the Cape Verde Islands to the west at Category 1 strength. The storm later reached Category 2 status after passing the islands. Despite its close proximity to the islands, it's unclear if any watches or warnings were issued nor were any reports of damage or fatalities reported from the storm.
- August 25, 1901: 1901's sixth hurricane was first observed just east of Boa Vista in the Cape Verde Islands on August 25, and struck the island with tropical-storm-force winds a few hours later.
- August 29, 1901: 1901's seventh hurricane formed as a tropical depression about 115 mi (185 km) southeast of Praia, Cape Verde, quickly intensified into a tropical storm, then continued westward and became a hurricane. The storm caused no damage on the islands.
- August 25, 1906: 1906's fourth hurricane brushed the Cape Verde Islands as a 40 mph (64 km/h) tropical storm causing no damage. Days later, the storm strengthened into a Category 4 hurricane.
- September 2, 1927: 1927's second hurricane passed through the Cape Verde Islands as a tropical storm. There was no recorded damage after the storm's passing through the islands.
- September 6, 1928: The 1928 Lake Okeechobee Hurricane passed through the Cape Verde Islands as a weak tropical storm.
- September 10, 1938: The 1938 New England Hurricane passed through the Cape Verde Islands as a 40 mph (64 km/h) tropical storm.
- September 5, 1947: The 1947 Fort Lauderdale hurricane brushed the Cape Verde Islands as a Category 1 hurricane at 0000 UTC. There were no reports of damage or injuries from the hurricane.
- September 5, 1948: The 1948 Bermuda–Newfoundland hurricane brushed the Cape Verde Islands as a Category 1 hurricane. There were no reports of damage or injuries from that storm.

=== 1950–1999 ===
- August 19, 1952: Hurricane Able struck the Cape Verde Islands as a depression.
- August 28, 1953: Hurricane Carol passed through the Cape Verde Islands before as a depression.
- September 3, 1957: Hurricane Carrie passed south of the Cape Verde Islands as a depression causing no damage.
- August 8, 1958: Tropical Storm Becky passed through the Cape Verde Islands before reaching tropical storm strength. There were no reports of damage.
- August 11, 1958: Hurricane Cleo formed south of the Cape Verde Islands, causing minor damage.
- September 5, 1964: Tropical Storm Florence brushed the Cape Verde Islands before reaching tropical storm strength. The storm caused no known damage.
- September 5, 1967: Hurricane Chloe passed through the Cape Verde Islands as a depression.
- October 5, 1967: Tropical Storm Ginger formed east of the Cape Verde Islands on October 5. The storm reached a peak intensity of 50 mph before dissipating two days later. Ginger's formation was the farthest east on record for an Atlantic tropical cyclone.
- September 12, 1968: Tropical Storm Edna brushed the Cape Verde Islands before reaching tropical storm strength.
- August 25, 1973: Tropical Storm Christine formed over western Africa at 10°N-15°W before reaching tropical storm strength.
- September 15, 1973: Hurricane Ellen brushed the Cape Verde Islands as a 45 mph (72 km/h) tropical storm, before becoming a hurricane.
- September 4, 1979: Hurricane Gloria brushed the northern Cape Verde Islands as a tropical depression.
- September 4, 1980: Hurricane Earl brushed the northern Cape Verde Islands as a tropical depression.

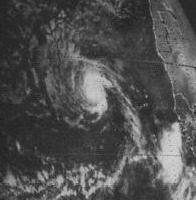
Tropical Storm Beryl, August 29, 1982

- August 29, 1982: Tropical Storm Beryl of 1982 passed south of the Cape Verde Islands, killing 3 people and injuring 112 people.
- September 16, 1984: Tropical Storm Fran bypassed the Cape Verde Islands to the south whilst strengthening. The storm killed 31 people, mainly from landslides and flooding.
- September 8, 1988: An unnamed tropical storm formed extremely close to western Africa on September 6 where it moved slightly northwestward and dissipated. It was not named because of its extreme location at the time, and it was originally thought to be a tropical depression. However, post storm analysis revealed that the system had maintained tropical storm strength for at least 48 hours. The storm produced heavy rain but caused no reported damage.
- September 18, 1989: Hurricane Erin passed through the Cape Verde Islands as a tropical depression, causing no damage.
- September 21, 1998: Hurricane Jeanne of 1998 passed south of the Cape Verde Islands as a Category 1 hurricane. Because of Jeanne's rapid formation, forecasters predicted that the storm will bring tropical storm conditions to the Cape Verde Islands. However, the storm's center stayed off shore and there were no reports of damage.

=== 2000–present ===
- September 9, 2003: Tropical Depression Fourteen brushed the Cape Verde Islands after reaching peak intensity of 35 mph (56 km/h). The depression produced heavy rainfall and gusty winds to the islands.
- November 23, 2005: Tropical Storm Delta, after meandering eastward in the Atlantic Ocean for several days, struck the Canary Islands shortly after becoming extratropical, and 70 mph (110 km/h) winds with 90 mph (150 km/h) gusts caused over $360 million (2005 USD) in damage and nineteen deaths. The remnants of Delta then struck Morocco, where no damage was reported.
- August 21, 2006: Tropical Storm Debby passed south of the Cape Verde Islands as a tropical depression. A tropical storm warning was issued for the Cape Verde Islands, but was discontinued when Debby turned further westward and away from the islands.
- September 9, 2010: Hurricane Igor passed about 30 miles (48 km) to the south of the southernmost Cape Verde islands as a tropical storm, bringing tropical storm force winds to Brava and Fogo.

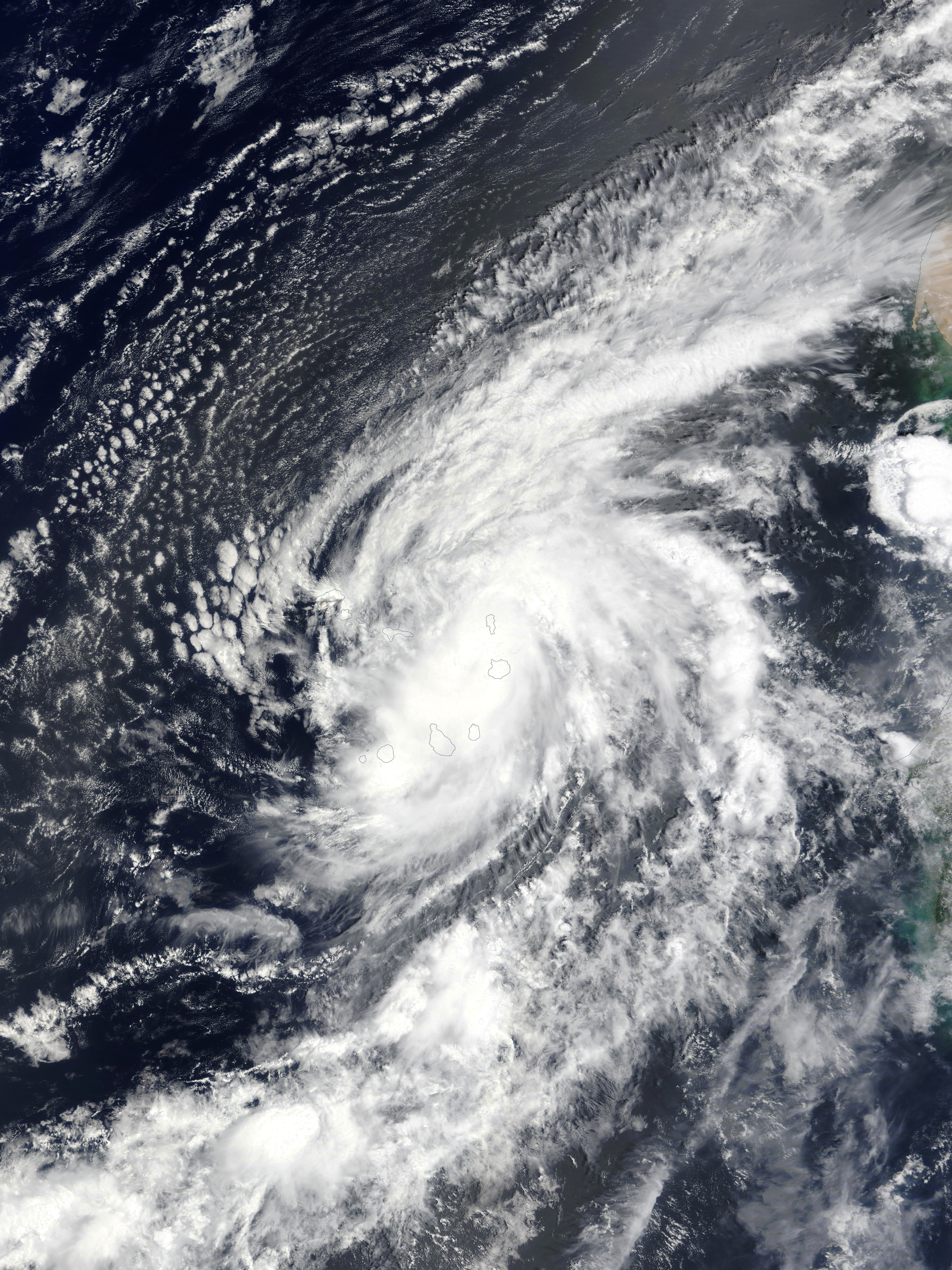
Hurricane Fred at Category 1 strength over Cape Verde, August 31, 2015

- August 31, 2015: Hurricane Fred reached Category 1 strength as it hit Cape Verde, resulting in hurricane conditions across many of the islands. Seven people died when their fishing boat capsized off the coast of Guinea-Bissau, and another two fishermen were presumed dead after never returning to Boa Vista.
- September 8, 2018: Hurricane Helene dropped heavy rainfall in Guinea as a tropical storm, triggering flooding that claimed three lives in Doko.
- September 7, 2020: Tropical Storm Rene developed just east of Cabo Verde and made landfall on Boa Vista with 1-minute sustained winds of 40 mph (65 km/h) and a pressure of 1001 mbar (29.56 inHg) at around 00:00 UTC on September 8, 2020, while producing tropical-storm-force winds and heavy rains throughout the archipelago.
- September 12, 2020: The precursor to Tropical Storm Vicky passed by Praia, Cabo Verde and caused 1 fatality.
- September 23, 2022: Tropical Storm Hermine developed to the east of Cabo Verde, moved generally northward parallel to the West African coast, then brought record rainfall to the Canary Islands, causing €10 million (US $9.8 million) in damages.
- August 11, 2025: Hurricane Erin developed as it moved westward over Cape Verde, causing nine flooding-related deaths on São Vicente. Between 00:00 to 05:00 local time on August 11, the island recorded 7.57 in (192.3 mm) of rainfall. On account of widespread property and infrastructure damage from the storm, the Cape Verde government issued a calamity declaration for São Vicente and Santo Antão. Five people were reported missing and 1,500 people were displaced.

== Monitoring stations ==
Cabo Verde has only one tropical cyclone monitoring station in Sal. In Africa, there are three tropical cyclone monitoring stations in Dakar, Senegal, Bamako, Mali and Niamey, Niger

== Climatological statistics ==
At least 32 tropical cyclones have affected Western Africa and its surrounding islands since records began in 1851. The majority of the storms affect West Africa and Cape Verde islands during the months of August and September which are the active months of a typical Atlantic hurricane season.

Month	Number of recorded storms affecting West Africa
August	11
September	20
October	1
November	1

== Deadliest storms ==
The following is a list of Atlantic tropical storms that caused fatalities in West Africa and its surrounding islands.

Name	Year	Number of deaths
Fran	1984	29–31
Delta	2005	19
Fred	2015	9
Erin	2025	9
Beryl	1982	3
Helene	2018	3
Vicky	2020	1

== See also ==
- Lists of Atlantic hurricanes
