= List of storms named Hermine =

The name Hermine has been used for six tropical cyclones in the Atlantic Ocean.

- Tropical Storm Hermine (1980) – strong tropical storm that made landfalls in Belize, the Yucatán Peninsula and in Veracruz, causing widespread flooding
- Tropical Storm Hermine (1998) – weak tropical storm that struck Louisiana, causing minimal damage
- Tropical Storm Hermine (2004) – made landfall in Massachusetts as a minimal tropical storm, causing very limited damage
- Tropical Storm Hermine (2010) – made landfall in Tamaulipas, then moved over the U.S. Southern Plains before dissipating, causing extensive flooding and tornadoes; formed from the remnants of Tropical Depression Eleven-E in the East Pacific
- Hurricane Hermine (2016) – Category 1 hurricane that made landfall in the Florida Panhandle, causing extensive damage in the Southeast U.S.
- Tropical Storm Hermine (2022) – weak and short-lived tropical storm that brought significant rainfall to the Canary Islands

In the South-West Indian:

- Cyclone Hermine (1970) – tropical cyclone affected Reunion.

== See also ==
- Tropical Storm Hermione (1972) – a storm with a similar name which was used once in the South-West Indian Ocean
