= 1892 Atlantic hurricane season =

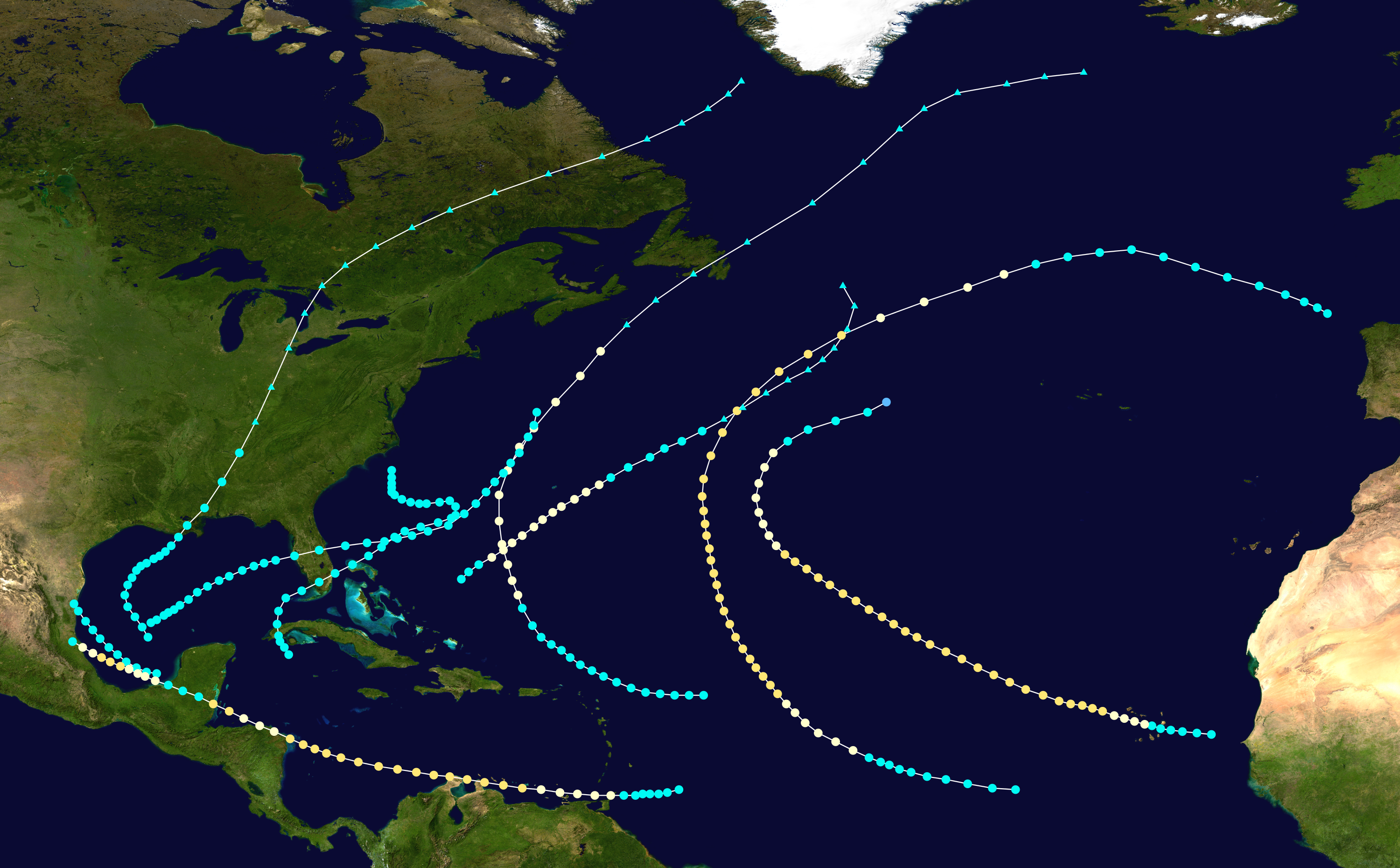
- Season summary map

Seasonal boundaries
- First system formed: June 9, 1892
- Last system dissipated: October 29, 1892

Strongest storm
- Name: Three, Five, and Seven
  - Maximum winds: 100 mph (155 km/h) (1-minute sustained)

Seasonal statistics
- Total storms: 9
- Hurricanes: 5
- Major hurricanes (Cat. 3+): 0
- Total fatalities: 33
- Total damage: $1.5 million (1892 USD)

Related article
- 1890s North Indian Ocean cyclone seasons

The 1892 Atlantic hurricane season included the last tropical cyclone on record to pass through the Cabo Verde Islands at hurricane intensity until 2015. A total of nine tropical storms developed, five of which strengthened into a hurricane, though none of them became a major hurricane. (Note: A major hurricane is a storm that ranks as Category 3 or higher on the Saffir–Simpson hurricane wind scale.) However, in the absence of modern satellite and other remote-sensing technologies, only storms that affected populated land areas or encountered ships at sea were recorded, so the actual total could be higher. An undercount bias of zero to six tropical cyclones per year between 1851 and 1885 and zero to four per year between 1886 and 1910 has been estimated. Three tropical storms made landfall on the United States.

Neither meteorologists José Fernández-Partagás and Henry F. Diaz in 1996 nor the Atlantic hurricane reanalysis project in the early 21st century added or removed any storms during their reanalysis of the season, though the latter upgraded the eighth storm to a hurricane. A reanalysis study by climate researcher Michael Chenoweth, published in 2014, concluded that 11 cyclones formed in the Atlantic in 1892. Chenoweth proposed the removal of the ninth system from the official hurricane database (HURDAT) and the addition of three storms. However, the changes suggested in Chenoweth's study have yet to be included in HURDAT.

On June 9, the first storm of the season developed over the northwestern Caribbean Sea. Striking Cuba and Florida, the cyclone dropped heavy precipitation in both regions. Flooding in the former rendered approximately $1.5 million (1892 USD) in damage and at least 16 deaths. (Note: All damage figures are in 1892 USD, unless otherwise noted) Two other systems struck the United States in 1892, though neither caused much impact. In October, a hurricane passed near Tobago and moved across Venezuela, Colombia, Honduras, British Honduras, and Mexico, leaving damage in several regions and 17 fatalities, 16 of which occurred when a schooner capsized near Cabo Gracias a Dios. The ninth and final system was last noted on October 29. Collectively, the storms of the 1892 season inflicted at least 33 deaths and more than $1.5 million in damage.

== Season summary ==
The Atlantic hurricane database (HURDAT) officially recognizes that nine tropical cyclones formed during the 1892 season, five of which strengthened into a hurricane, but none of those intensified into a major hurricane. The Atlantic hurricane reanalysis project in the early 21st century did not add or remove any storms from the 1996 reanalysis of the season by meteorologists José Fernández-Partagás and Henry F. Diaz, although the former upgraded the eighth system from a tropical storm to a Category 1 hurricane. However, a more recent reanalysis by climate researcher Michael Chenoweth, published in 2014, adds three storms and removes one – the ninth system – for a net gain of two cyclones, although these proposed changes have yet to be approved for inclusion to HURDAT. Chenoweth's study utilizes a more extensive collection of newspapers and ship logs, as well as late 19th century weather maps for the first time, in comparison to previous reanalysis projects. Chenoweth's proposals have yet to be incorporated into HURDAT, however.

The season's first known cyclone was initially detected over the northwestern Caribbean Sea on June 9. Striking Cuba and Florida, the storm caused about $1.5 million in damage and at least 16 deaths in the former. After this system was last noted offshore North Carolina on June 16, seasonal activity went dormant for nearly two months, until a steamship encountered the second cyclone on August 15. September featured the most activity, with four systems, two tropical storms and two Category 2 hurricanes on the present-day Saffir–Simpson scale that peaked with maximum sustained winds of 100 mph (155 km/h). Three other cyclones formed in October, one tropical storm and two hurricanes. The season's seventh system moved on a low-latitude path that brought it over or near the Windward Islands, the ABC islands, and the Guajira Peninsula before turning northwestward and striking Nicaragua, British Honduras, and Mexico. Seventeen fatalities occurred, one on Trinidad and sixteen after a schooner capsized near Cabo Gracias a Dios. The season's ninth and final cyclone was last noted offshore the Northeastern United States on October 29.

The season's activity was reflected with an accumulated cyclone energy (ACE) rating of 116, tied with the previous season for the fifth-highest total of the decade. ACE is a metric used to express the energy used by a tropical cyclone during its lifetime. Therefore, a storm with a longer duration will have higher values of ACE. It is only calculated at six-hour increments in which specific tropical and subtropical systems are either at or above sustained wind speeds of 39 mph (63 km/h), which is the threshold for tropical storm intensity. Thus, tropical depressions are not included here.

== Systems ==
=== Tropical Storm One ===
- Tropical storm (SSHWS)
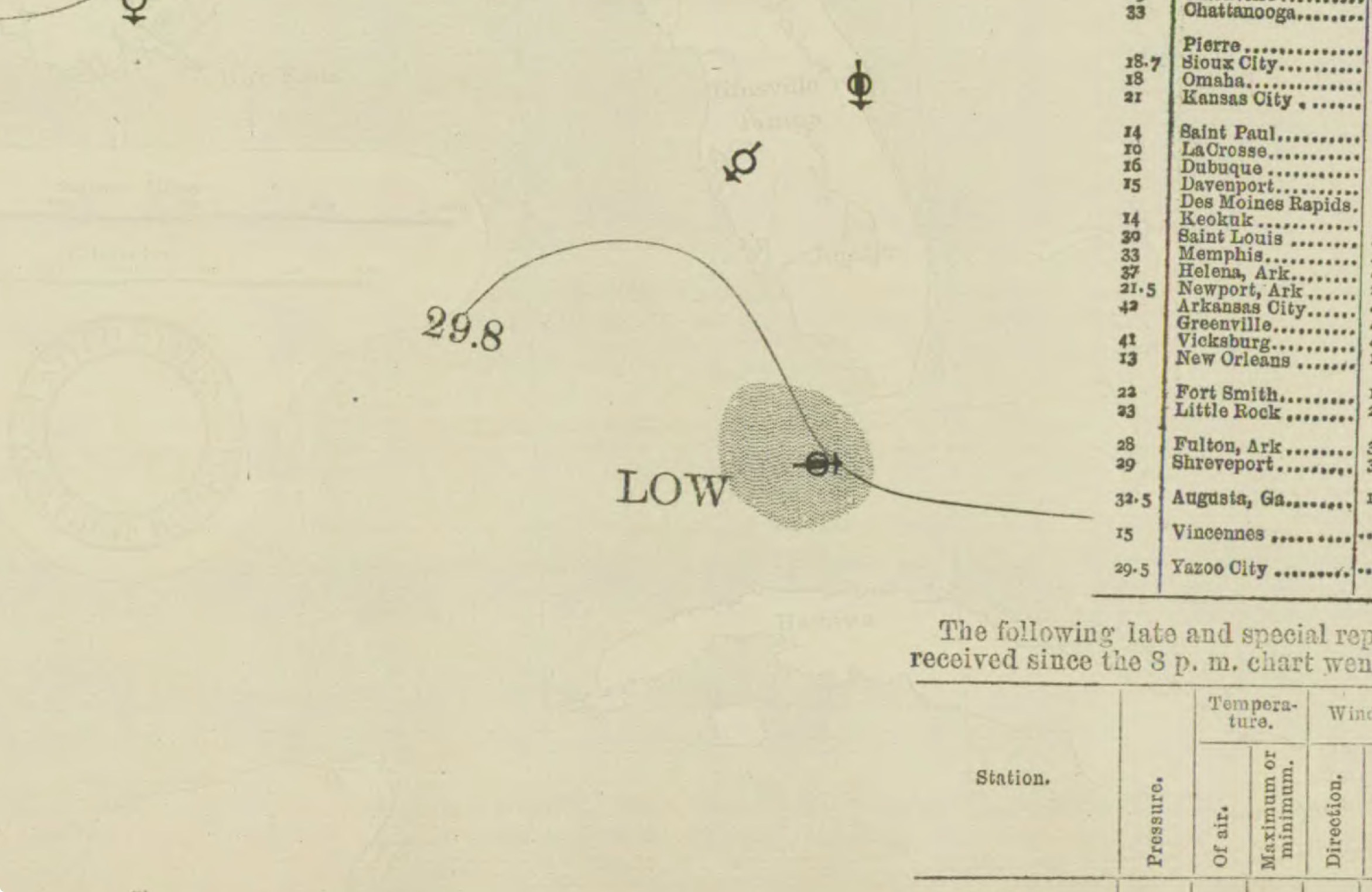
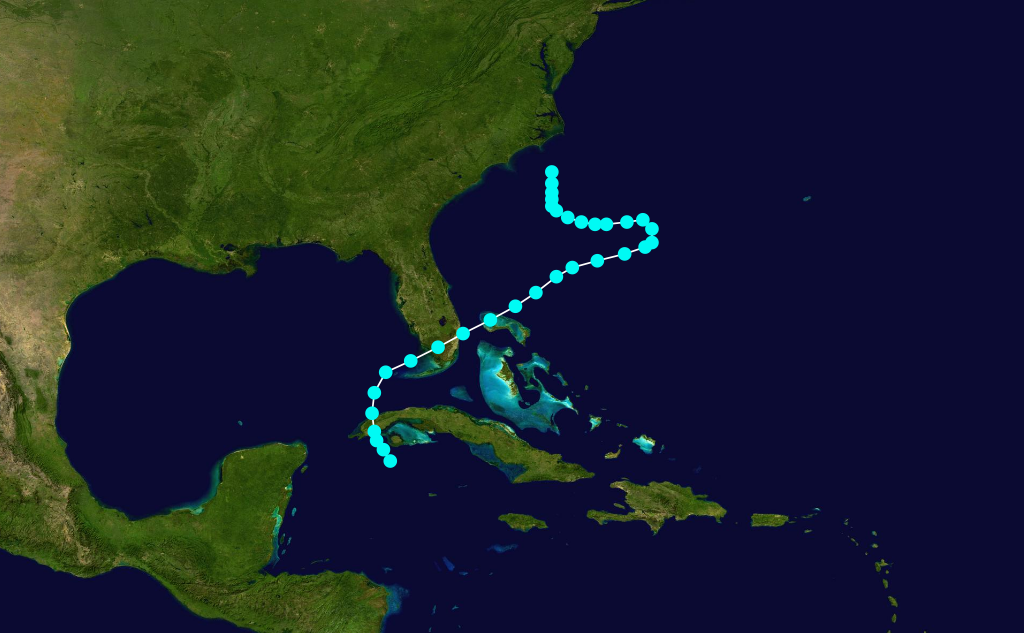
- Duration: June 9 – June 16
- Peak intensity: 50 mph (85 km/h) (1-min); ≤1005 mbar (hPa)

The first tropical storm developed about 45 mi (70 km) south of Isla de la Juventud on June 9. Initially moving northwestward, the storm made landfall later that day on the south coast of Pinar del Río Province in Cuba. The storm recurved northward and entered the Gulf of Mexico early the following morning, where it intensified and peaked with maximum sustained winds of 50 mph (85 km/h). Around that time, it turned to the northeast and made landfall at 23:00 UTC on June 10 in northern Monroe County, Florida, at the same intensity. The cyclone crossed Florida and emerged into the Atlantic Ocean near modern-day Deerfield Beach early the following day. Thereafter, the system headed out to sea for a few days, before re-approaching the Southeastern United States. Late on June 16, it was last noted about 80 mi (130 km) south-southeast of Cape Lookout, North Carolina.

Climate researcher Michael Chenoweth proposed a similar path and duration for this system, but adding a tropical depression stage at the beginning, with the cyclone not reaching tropical storm until June 10, when it was located near the Florida Keys. In Cuba, modest winds and heavy rainfall were reported from Santa Clara to Pinar del Río, with the worst impact conditions being experienced in Matanzas. There, the San Juan and Yumurí rivers overflowed, causing water to rise 10 ft (3.0 m) above most houses. Civil guards and troops assisted rescue work and evacuation of residents. Floodwaters swept away furniture in 325 houses, killed roughly 450 head of cattle, and carried off 600,000 bags of sugar in warehouses. The storm left at least 16 deaths and approximately $1.5 million in damage. The storm also brought winds and rains to Florida. In just a few hours, Hypoluxo recorded 3.6 in (91 mm), while Titusville measured 12.95 in (329 mm) over a period lasting six days. In Jupiter, multiple trees were downed and severe damage was inflicted on crops.

=== Hurricane Two ===
- Category 1 hurricane (SSHWS)
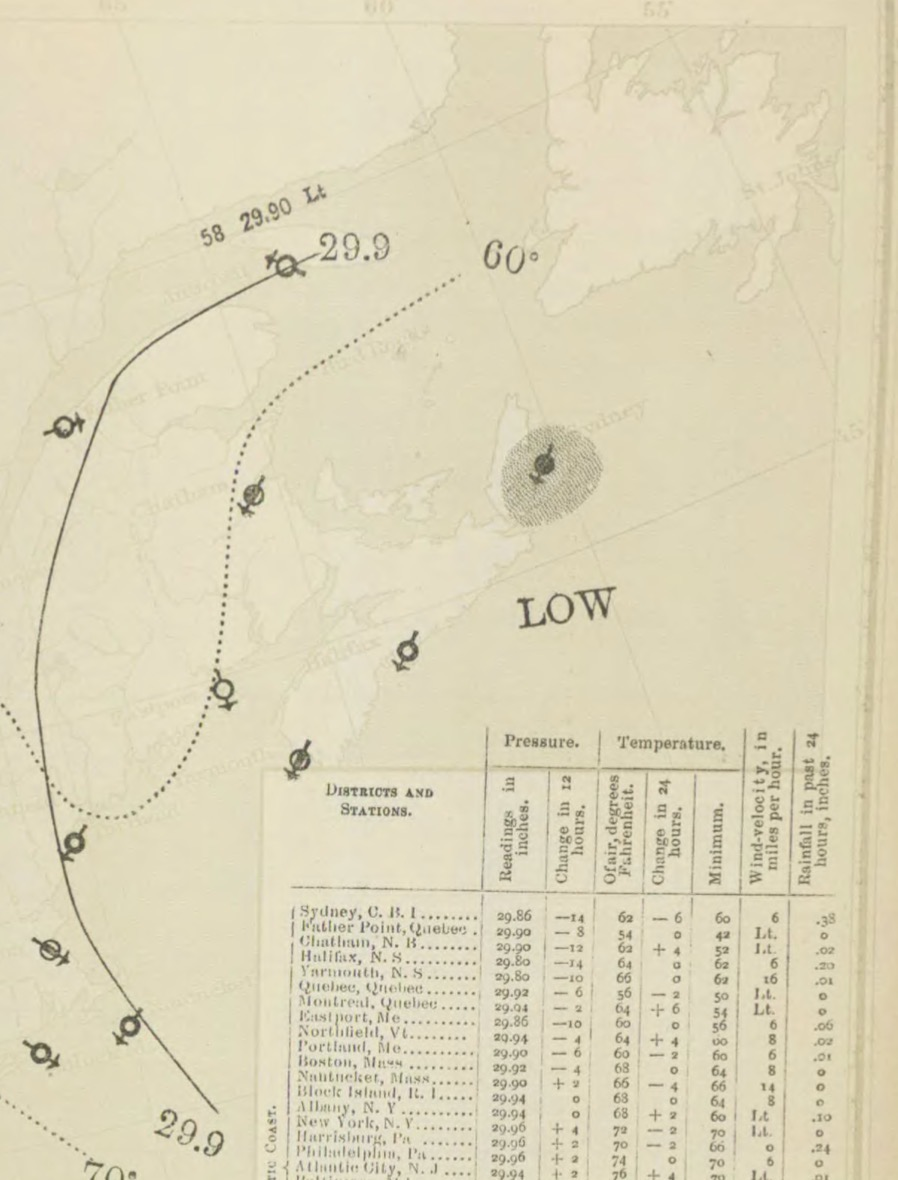
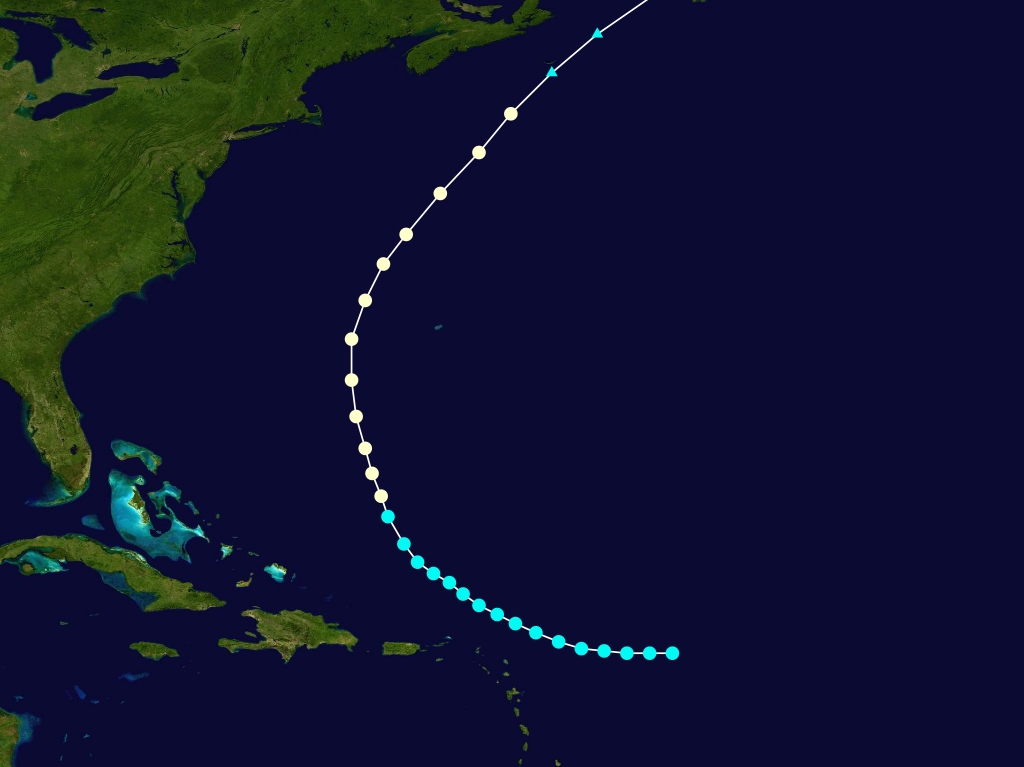
- Duration: August 15 – August 21
- Peak intensity: 75 mph (120 km/h) (1-min);

On August 15, the steamship Francia encountered a tropical storm east of the northernmost Lesser Antilles. The storm initially moved westward but curved northwestward by the following day, causing it to remain north of the islands, although Saint Thomas and Tortola reported thunderstorms and heavy rains. A north-northwestward motion of the storm commenced by August 18, while the cyclone reached hurricane status on the next day. During this time, the steamship Duart Castle encountered the system; rough seas caused severe damage to the ship and shifted around its cargo, injuring six people. The storm passed west of Bermuda between August 19 and August 20. Winds remained just below tropical storm-force winds on the island; a church, many trees, and lime and orange crops suffered extensive damage, however. The system then curved northeastward, continuing in that direction until becoming extratropical near Sable Island on August 21. The extratropical storm hit Newfoundland, and completely lost its identity on August 24. In his 2014 study, Chenoweth extended the track back to August 14. The storm also became more intense than indicated by HURDAT, strengthening into a major hurricane.

=== Hurricane Three ===
- Category 2 hurricane (SSHWS)
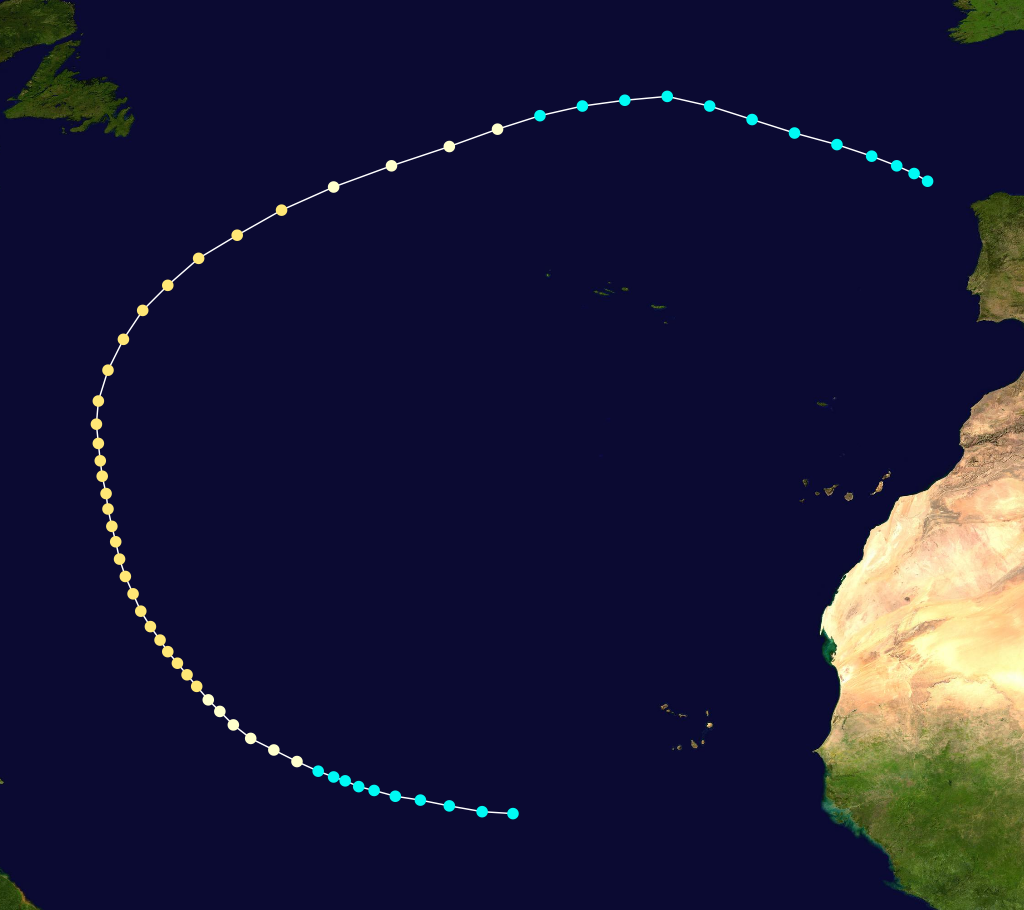
- Duration: September 3 – September 17
- Peak intensity: 100 mph (155 km/h) (1-min);

The official track for this storm begins well southwest of the Cabo Verde Islands on September 3, one day before being encountered by a ship. Initially trekking west-northwestward, the system is estimated to have intensified into a hurricane on September 5. Strengthening further, the cyclone reached Category 2 intensity on the modern-day Saffir–Simpson scale on September 7, likely peaking with maximum sustained winds of 100 mph (155 km/h). The storm moved in a large, mostly parabolic path across the Atlantic, turning north-northwestward on September 9, north-northeastward on September 11, and then northeastward on September 13. It is estimated that the cyclone weakened back to tropical storm intensity on September 14, a day before turning east-southeastward while well north of the Azores. The storm was last noted near the Galicia region of Spain on September 17. Chenoweth's study kept this system as a tropical storm until September 7, while also arguing that the cyclone did not strengthen beyond a minimal Category 1 hurricane. He also adds an extratropical transition on September 15.

=== Tropical Storm Four ===
- Tropical storm (SSHWS)
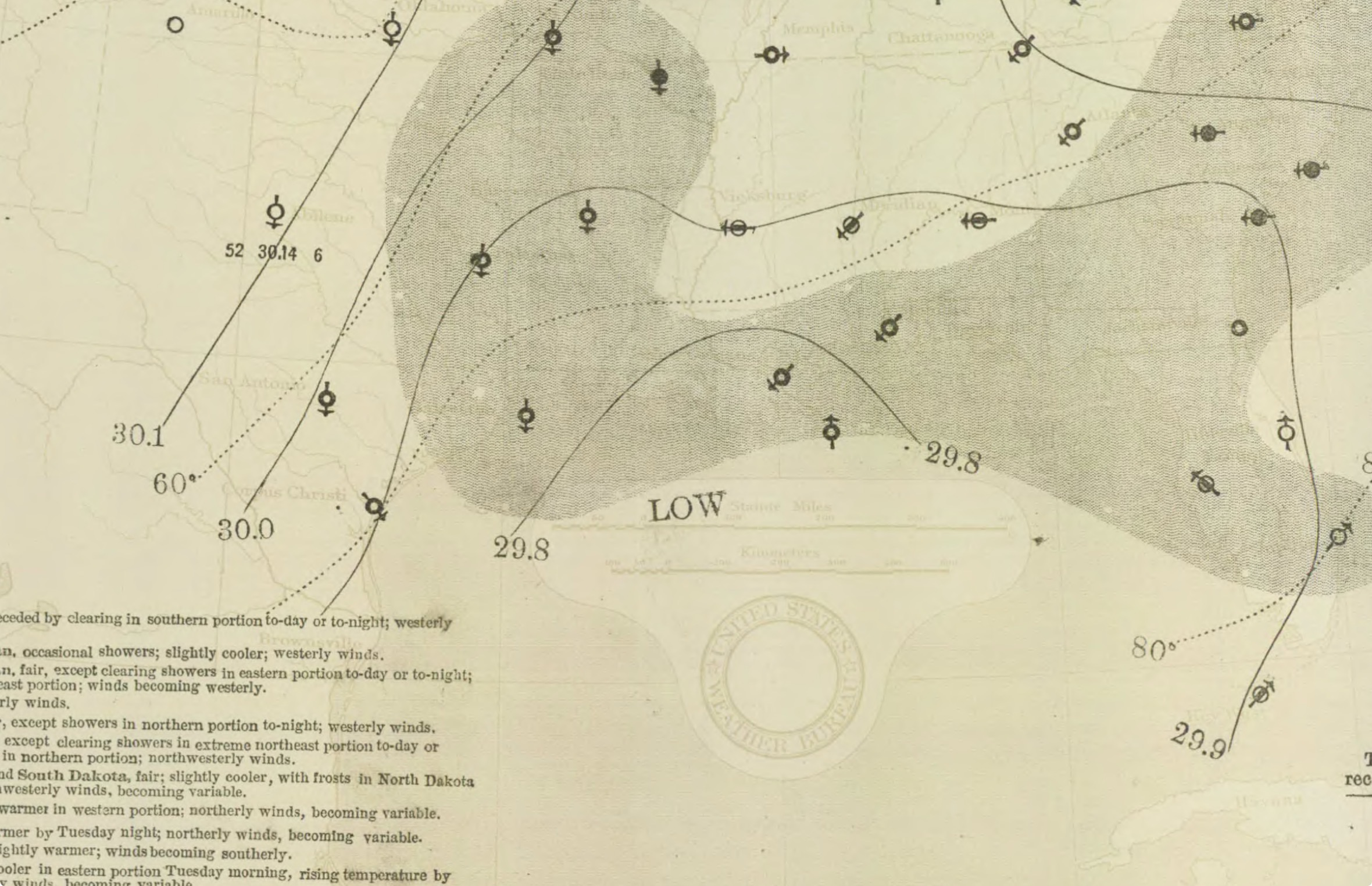
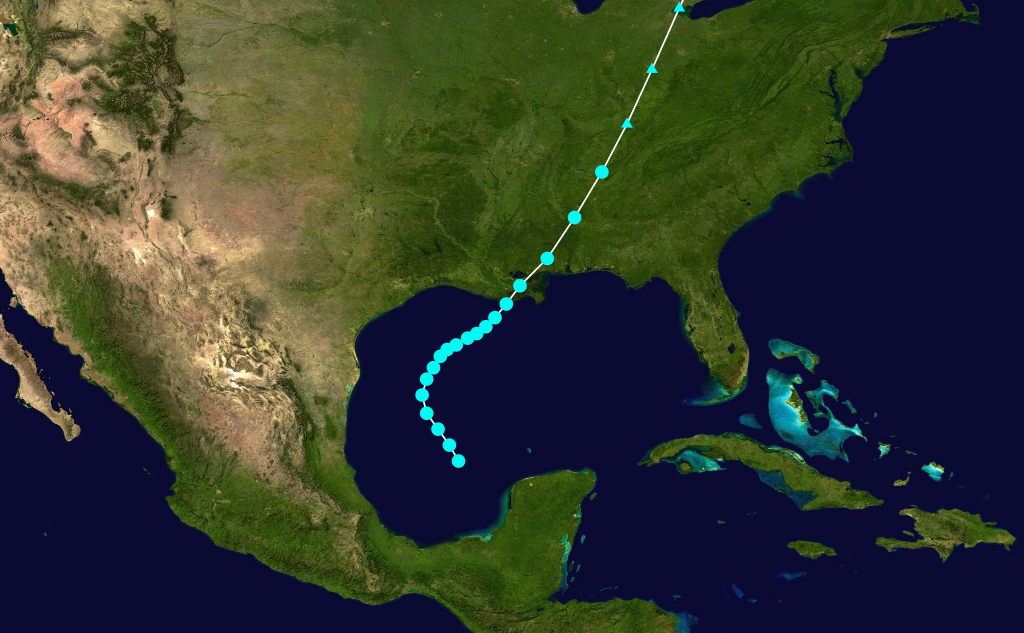
- Duration: September 8 – September 13
- Peak intensity: 60 mph (95 km/h) (1-min);

The track for this storm begins over the southwestern Gulf of Mexico on September 8, when The New York Times declared that "a general disturbance appears developing", with decreasing atmospheric pressures. Initially moving northwestward, the storm turned northeastward on September 10 and intensified to its estimated peak sustained winds of 60 mph (95 km/h). Early on September 12, the system made landfall near Golden Meadow, Louisiana, and then accelerated north-northeastward. The storm weakened inland and transitioned into an extratropical cyclone on September 13 over Kentucky. Thereafter, the extratropical remnants of the storm crossed Ohio and eastern Canada, emerging into the Labrador Sea on September 16. By the following day, the extratropical cyclone dissipated near southern Greenland.

The New York Times noted that nearly all weather stations across the Gulf Coast of the United States reported rainfall in association with this storm. Pensacola, Florida, observed wind gusts up to 54 mph (87 km/h), while the extratropical remnants of the storm produced an identical measurement in Cleveland, Ohio. According to Chenoweth's 2014 study, this cyclone instead developed near the north coast of the Yucatán Peninsula on September 10. Instead of making landfall in Louisiana, the system struck the western Florida Panhandle and quickly dissipated over Alabama.

=== Hurricane Five ===
- Category 2 hurricane (SSHWS)
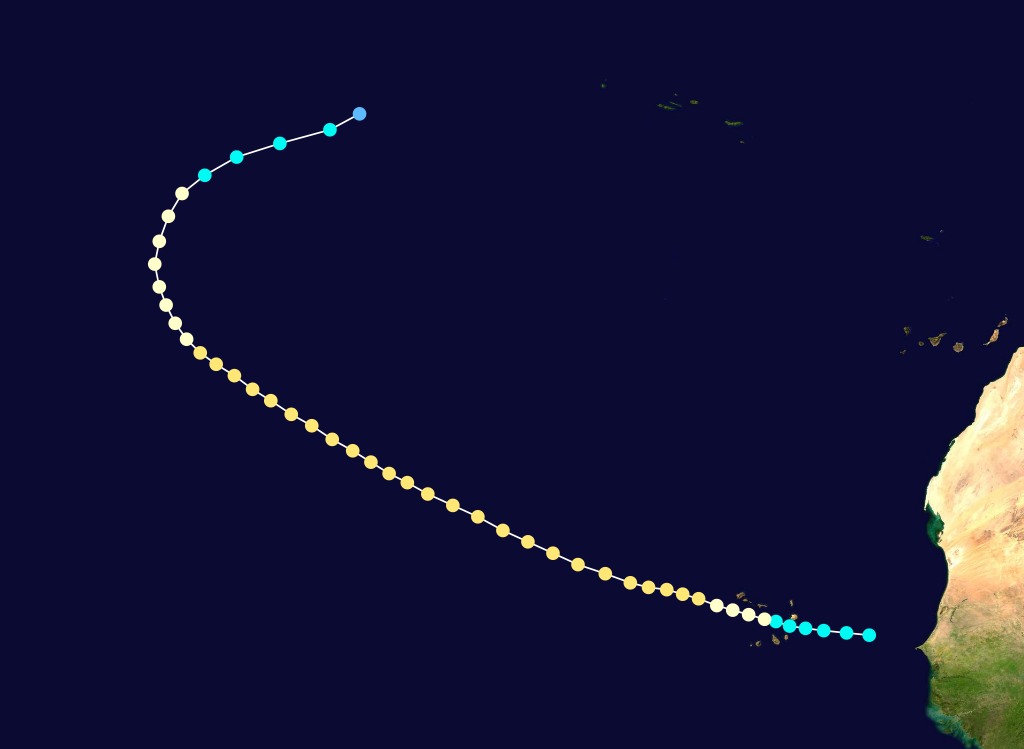
- Duration: September 12 – September 23
- Peak intensity: 100 mph (155 km/h) (1-min);

Observations first indicate the presence of a tropical storm on September 12 about 140 mi (225 km) west-northwest of Dakar, Senegal. The storm moved west-northwestward through the Capo Verde Islands without making landfall and intensified into a hurricane on the following day roughly halfway between São Nicolau and Santiago. While crossing through the archipelago, storm surge and abnormally high tides caused several vessels to flounder. On land, the hurricane destroyed many dwellings, severely damaged plantations, and killed "a quantity of cattle", according to The Times. Aside from this system, Hurricane Fred in 2015 became the only other cyclone to pass through the Capo Verde Islands as a hurricane.

After entering the open Atlantic, the cyclone strengthened and likely peaked with winds of 100 mph (155 km/h) on September 14, equivalent to a Category 2 hurricane. The storm may have remained at this intensity for nearly a week, falling back to Category 1 hurricane status on September 20 as it began turning northwestward. By September 22, the hurricane curved northeastward, several hours before falling to tropical storm intensity. The cyclone then weakened to a tropical depression late on September 23 and was last noted about 575 mi (925 km) west-southwest of Flores Island in the Azores. While Chenoweth did not suggest significant changes to the storm's duration, peak intensity, or path, he proposed a 12-hour tropical depression stage on September 12 and then an extratropical transition on September 23.

=== Tropical Storm Six ===
- Tropical storm (SSHWS)
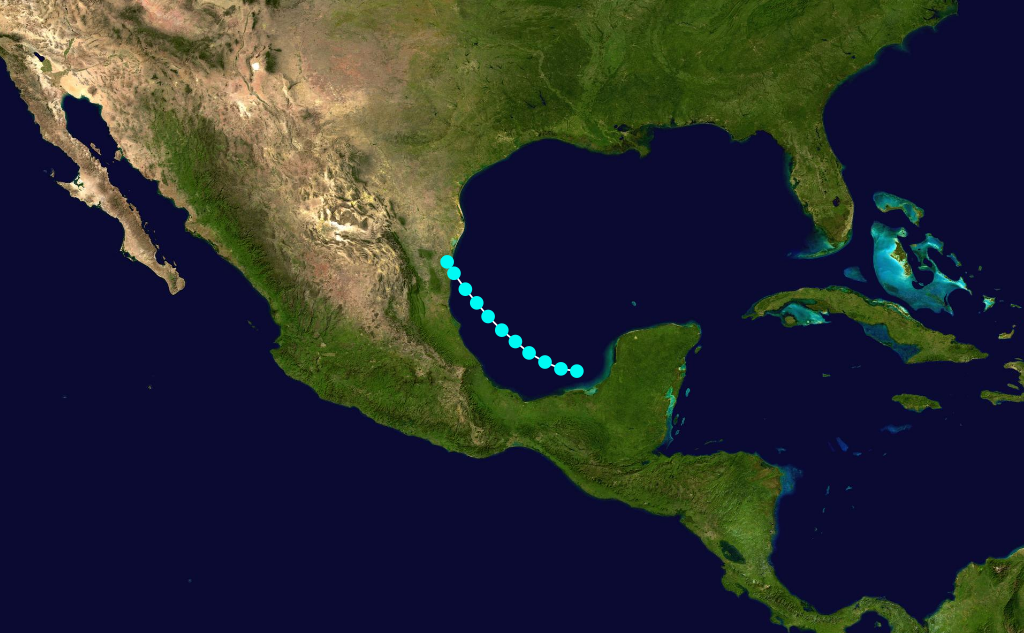
- Duration: September 25 – September 27
- Peak intensity: 60 mph (95 km/h) (1-min);

The sixth tropical storm of the season was a very short-lived storm that was first recorded northwest of Ciudad del Carmen on September 25. The storm travelled northwest across the Bay of Campeche before making landfall near the Mexico-Texas border, dissipating inland on September 27. In the state of Veracruz, the cyclone demolished over 60 homes in Tuxtepec and many others in rural areas outside the city. The storm also inflicted extensive damage to many trees and local banana plantations. Additionally, Orizaba reported significant losses to banana, corn, rice, and tobacco crops. Chenoweth proposed that this system actually developed on September 23 as a tropical depression over the northwestern Caribbean. Moving northwestward, the cyclone crossed Yucatán Peninsula and then turned southwestward after reaching the Gulf of Mexico. By September 27, the system moved generally northward and made landfall near present-day Port O'Connor, Texas, as a tropical storm on October 2. Chenoweth's study then argued that the storm dissipated the next day.

=== Hurricane Seven ===
- Category 2 hurricane (SSHWS)
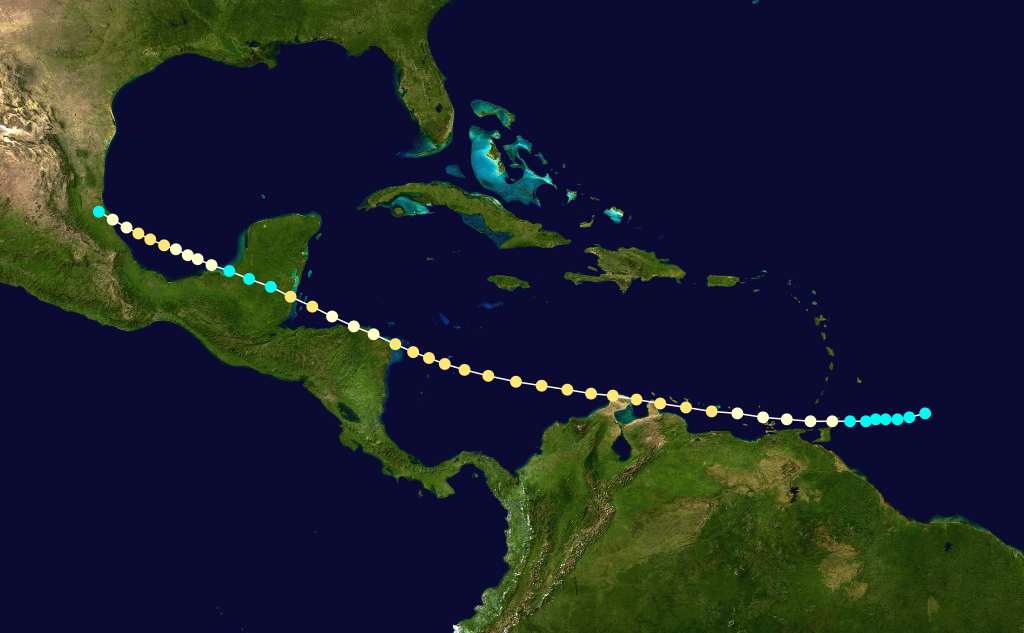
- Duration: October 5 – October 16
- Peak intensity: 100 mph (155 km/h) (1-min);

The track for this tropical storm begins about 290 mi (470 km) east of Tobago on October 5, one day before being detected on land. The storm moved generally westward and intensified into a hurricane as it passed just south of the island late the following day. Remaining over the far southern Caribbean, the hurricane passed near the ABC islands and then struck Paraguaná in Venezuela as a Category 2 hurricane with winds of 100 mph (155 km/h) on October 8. After briefly re-emerging into the Caribbean, the cyclone made landfall on the Guajira Peninsula several hours later. Thereafter, the system moved in a more west-northwesterly direction and then struck near Cabo Gracias a Dios on the Nicaragua–Honduras border on October 11. The storm weakened to a Category 1 hurricane while crossing Honduras, but re-strengthened into a Category 2 hurricane on October 12 after re-emerging into the Caribbean. Around 18:00 UTC that day, the hurricane made landfall just south of Belize City, British Honduras. Rapidly weakening to a tropical storm, the system soon re-strengthened into a hurricane after emerging into the Bay of Campeche about 24 hours later. The storm re-intensified into a Category 2 hurricane, but weakened to a Category 1 prior to making landfall south of Tampico, Tamaulipas, late on October 15. High terrain over eastern Mexico caused the system to dissipate early the next day.

The 2014 study by Chenoweth proposed a track that was generally slightly more southern than that shown in HURDAT, scraping the north coast of Trinidad, striking British Honduras near Monkey River Town, and then dissipating over the Mexican state of Puebla on October 16 after very briefly moving over the Bay of Campeche. Heavy rainfall and strong winds lashed Trinidad on October 6 and October 7. Several streams overflowed, causing a suspension of railroad service and leaving roads impassable. Port of Spain experienced a disruption of water services, while one death occurred in the city. Offshore, five lighters sank. The hurricane impacted Venezuela in the immediate aftermath of the Legalist Revolution, with the ousted former president hiding on Curaçao, which reported rough seas. La Guaira reportedly experienced its worst storm in 40 years due to landslides, destroying many homes. A railroad was also destroyed, while the city also lost communications with Caracas. Approximately 800 men worked to remove dirt and other debris left by the landslide along the railroad tracks. In Honduras, the storm caused significant damage to crops and banana plantations and demolished a number of residences. Several vessels capsized or went ashore, including the schooner Stranger offshore Cabo Gracias a Dios, causing 16 deaths. Some other ships sank at the Bay Islands, while many dwellings were destroyed on Roatán. In Mexico, several ships went missing offshore the city of Veracruz, where the storm also demolished many buildings.

=== Hurricane Eight ===
- Category 1 hurricane (SSHWS)
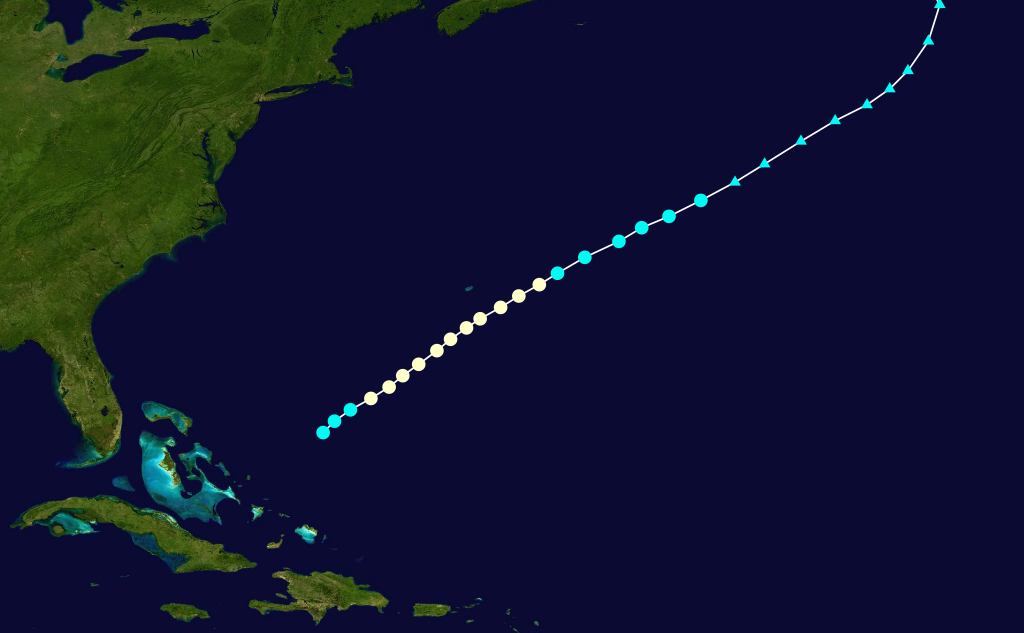
- Duration: October 13 – October 17
- Peak intensity: 90 mph (150 km/h) (1-min);

Ships encountered this cyclone between the Bahamas and Bermuda starting on October 13, with the official track beginning about 240 mi (390 km) northeast of San Salvador Island. Several hours later, the storm intensified into a hurricane while moving northeastward. The hurricane peaked with maximum sustained winds of 90 mph (150 km/h) on October 14. While the system passed southeast of Bermuda on the following day, wind gusts reached 73 mph (117 km/h) at Gibbs Hill Lighthouse. A tornado touched down on the eastern side of St. George's Island. On October 16, the cyclone weakened to a tropical storm and gradually lost tropical characteristics, becoming extratropical late on the next day about 665 mi (1,070 km) south of Cape Race, Newfoundland. The extratropical remnants generally continued northeastward until merging with another storm on October 20. Chenoweth's reanalysis study argued that this storm actually formed as a tropical depression late on October 13, while it was passing south of Bermuda. The cyclone also intensified slower than HURDAT indicates, becoming a tropical storm late on October 14 and then a hurricane about 24 hours later. However, Chenoweth's study also proposed that the system remained a tropical cyclone until October 20.

=== Tropical Storm Nine ===
- Tropical storm (SSHWS)
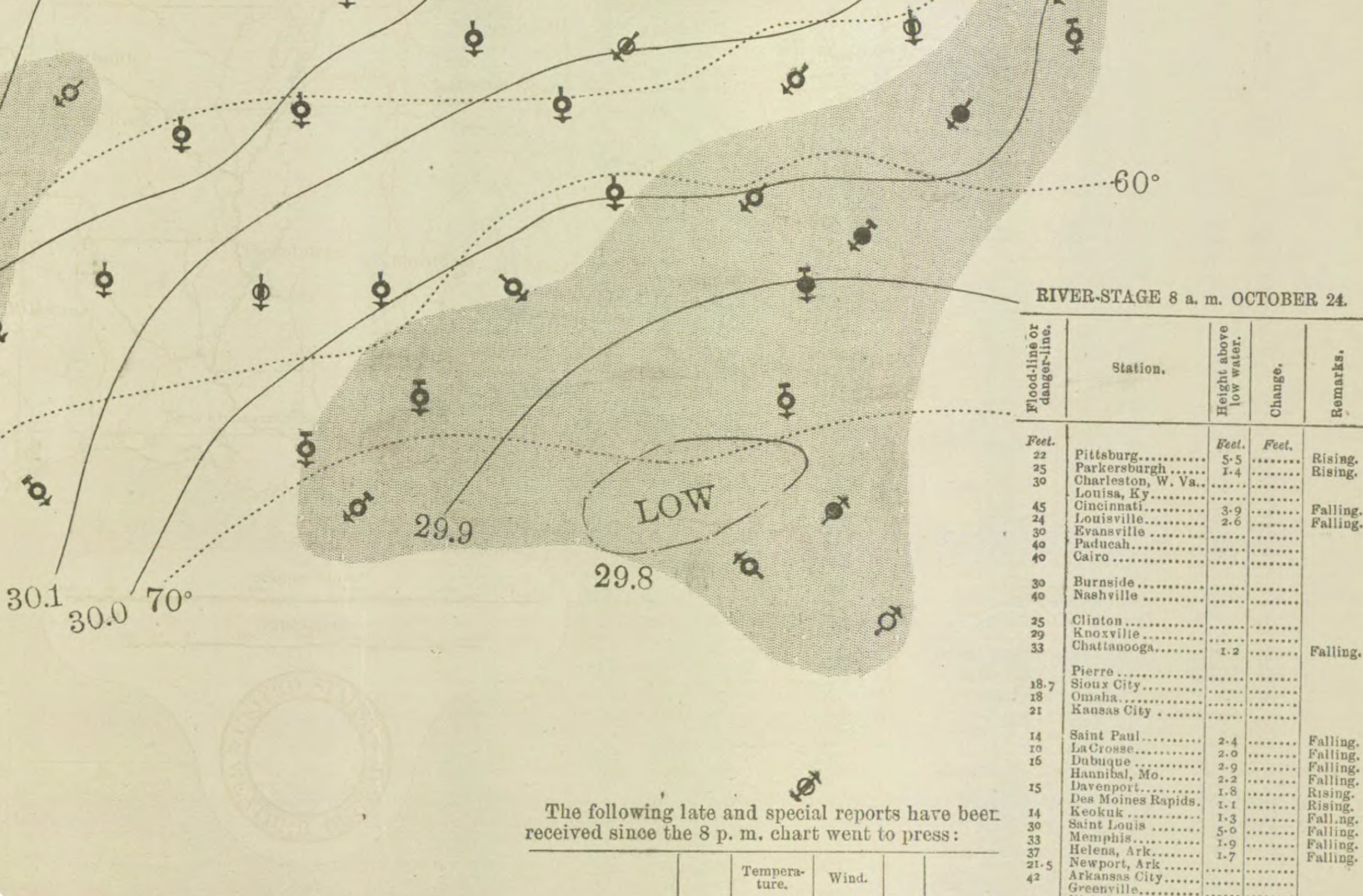
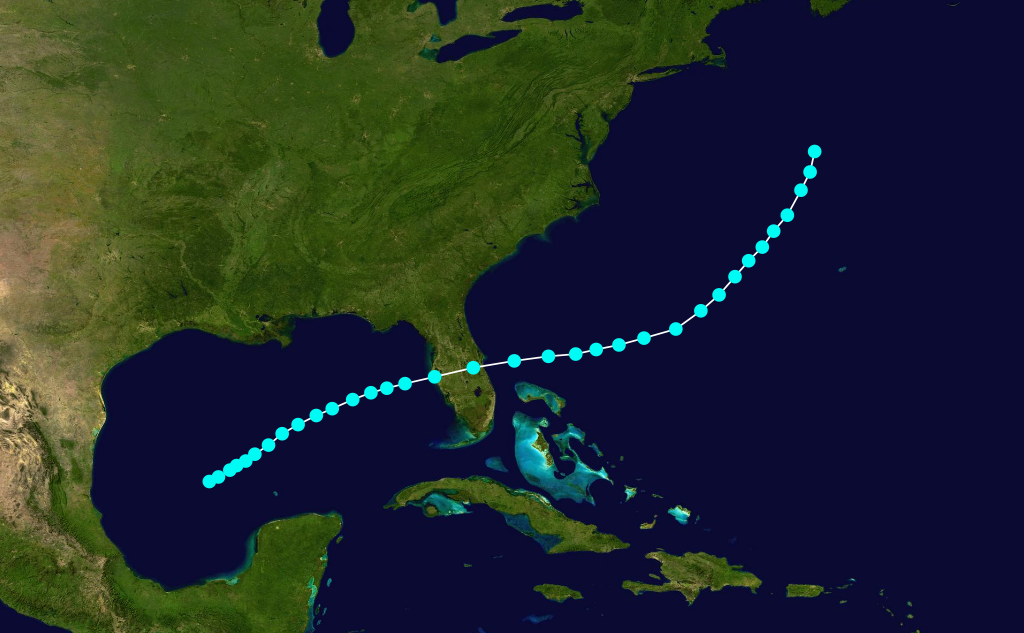
- Duration: October 21 – October 29
- Peak intensity: 50 mph (85 km/h) (1-min);

While weather reports first noted a low-pressure area over the central Gulf of Mexico on October 22, the official track for this storm begins one day earlier. The storm intensified slightly while moving northeastward, peaking with maximum sustained winds of 50 mph (85 km/h) on October 22. Around 19:00 UTC on October 24, the cyclone made landfall just north of Bradenton, Florida, at the same intensity. The system then tracked east-northeastward and emerged into the Atlantic earlier on the following day near Melbourne. On October 26, the storm resumed a northeastward motion until being last noted approximately 340 mi (545 km) southeast of Nantucket, Massachusetts, early on October 29. The cyclone produced wind gusts of 50 mph (85 km/h) in New Orleans, Louisiana, and 45 mph (70 km/h) in Pensacola, Florida. Heavy rains also fell along portions of the South Atlantic coast. Chenoweth considered this storm extratropical and instead attributed strong winds to pressure gradients.

=== Other storms ===
Chenoweth proposed three other storms not currently listed in HURDAT. The first of the three developed over the Yucatán Channel on June 20. Moving northwestward across the Gulf of Mexico, the cyclone struck southern Texas on June 24 and dissipated that day. On October 25, the next unofficial storm formed over the southwestern Caribbean. The system crossed far eastern Nicaragua and Honduras before re-emerging into the Caribbean. Chenoweth last documented this storm near the Cayman Islands on October 29. A third unofficial cyclone formed in the off-season over the central Atlantic on December 11. After initially moving southwest, the cyclone turned northeastward and intensified into a Category 1 hurricane. It was last documented just southwest of the Azores on December 15.

== Season effects ==
This is a table of all of the known storms that have formed in the 1892 Atlantic hurricane season. It includes their duration, landfall, damages, and death totals. Deaths in parentheses are additional and indirect (an example of an indirect death would be a traffic accident), but were still related to that storm. Damage and deaths include totals while the storm was extratropical, a wave, or a low, and all of the damage figures are in 1892 USD.

Saffir–Simpson scale
TD	TS	C1	C2	C3	C4	C5

1892 North Atlantic tropical cyclone season statistics
Storm name	Dates active	Storm category at peak intensity	Max 1-min wind mph (km/h)	Min. press. (mbar)	Areas affected	Damage (US$)	Deaths	Ref(s).
One	June 9–16	Tropical storm	50 (85)	1005	Cuba (Pinar del Río Province), Florida	$1.5 million	16	
Two	August 22–30	Category 1 hurricane	75 (120)	Unknown	Virgin Islands, Bermuda, Newfoundland	Unknown	None	
Three	September 3–17	Category 2 hurricane	100 (155)	Unknown	None	None	None	
Four	September 8–13	Tropical storm	60 (95)	Unknown	Gulf Coast of the United States, Eastern United States	Unknown	None	
Five	September 12–23	Category 2 hurricane	100 (155)	Unknown	Capo Verde Islands	Unknown	None	
Six	September 25–27	Tropical storm	60 (95)	Unknown	Mexico (Tamaulipas)	Unknown	None	
Seven	October 5–16	Category 2 hurricane	100 (155)	Unknown	Windward Islands, ABC islands, Venezuela, Colombia, Honduras, British Honduras, Mexico	Unknown	17	
Eight	October 13–17	Category 1 hurricane	90 (150)	Unknown	Bermuda	Unknown	Unknown	
Nine	October 21–29	Tropical storm	50 (85)	Unknown	Southeastern United States (Florida)	Unknown	None	
Season aggregates
9 systems	June 9 – October 29		100 (155)	Unknown		>$1.5 million	33	

== See also ==
- Atlantic hurricane reanalysis project
- Tropical cyclone observation
