= Tropical Storm Hermine (2022) =

Atlantic tropical storm

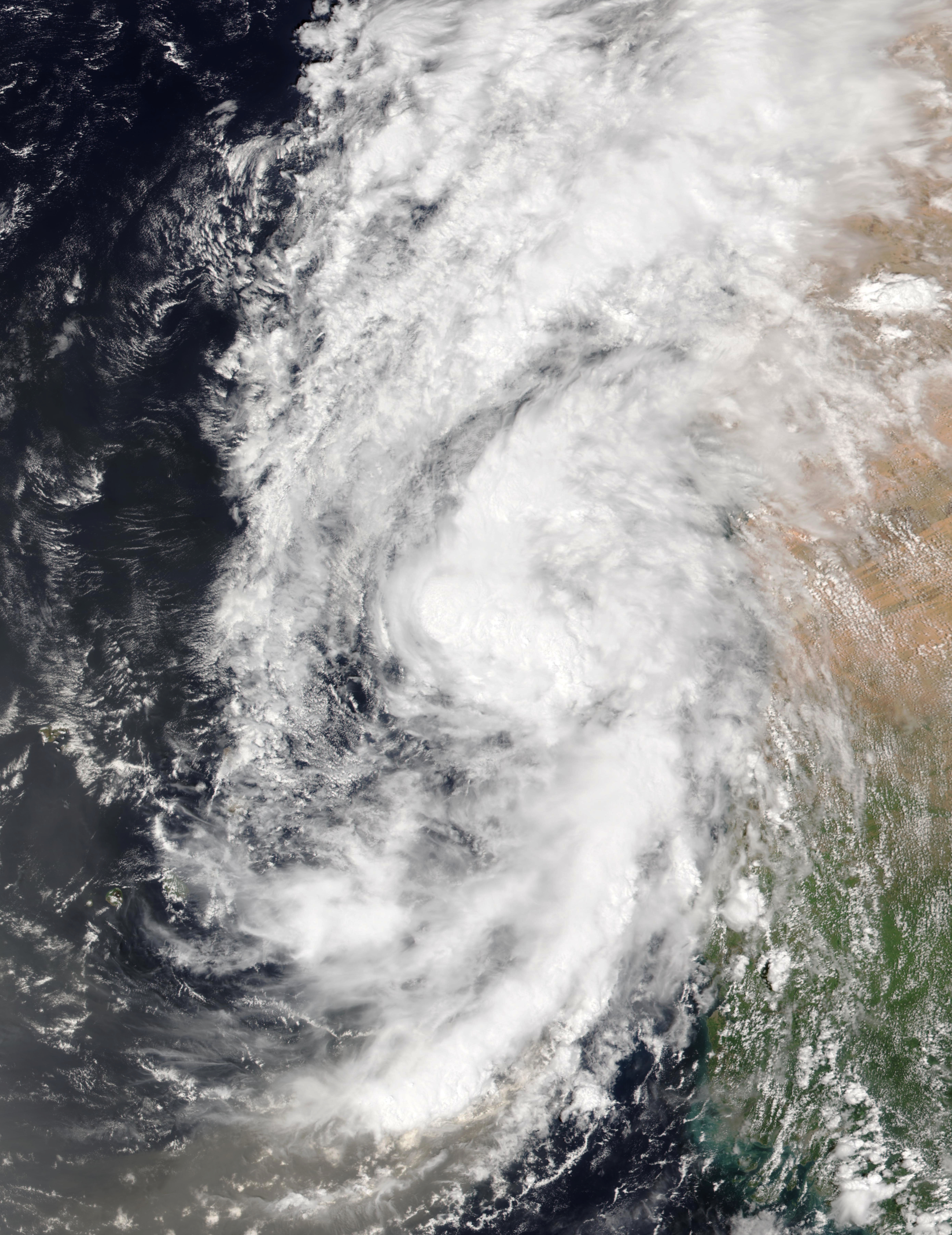
- Tropical Storm Hermine between Cabo Verde and West Africa on September 23

Meteorological history
- Formed: September 23, 2022
- Remnant low: September 24, 2022
- Dissipated: September 26, 2022

Tropical storm
- 1-minute sustained (SSHWS/NWS)
- Highest winds: 40 mph (65 km/h)
- Lowest pressure: 1003 mbar (hPa); 29.62 inHg

Overall effects
- Fatalities: None
- Damage: $9.8 million (2022 USD)
- Areas affected: Canary Islands
- IBTrACS /
- Part of the 2022 Atlantic hurricane season

Tropical Storm Hermine was a short-lived tropical cyclone that formed in the far eastern tropical Atlantic Ocean and brought record-breaking rains to the Canary Islands in September 2022. Hermine originated from a tropical wave first noted over West Africa on September 20. After emerging over the far eastern Atlantic Ocean, the system organized into a tropical depression on September 23. It soon became the eighth tropical storm of the 2022 Atlantic hurricane season as it progressed north. Increasing wind shear created a hostile environment for the cyclone and it failed to intensify beyond minimal tropical storm intensity as its convection was stripped far to the northeast. By September 24, Hermine's structure had sufficiently degraded to mark its degeneration into a remnant low. The residual system persisted for another two days before it was last noted over open ocean.

Hermine brought historic rainfall to the western Canary Islands over a three-day span. Accumulations reached 530 mm (20.87 in) in La Palma, more than 20 times the normal rainfall for the month of September. Many areas reported more than 100 mm (3.9 in) of rain throughout the event. The tremendous rainfall significantly disrupted air travel and damaged roads across the archipelago. Many structures suffered from flooding and total damage exceeded 10 million euro (US$9.8 million). Approximately 3,000 customers lost electricity, with service restoration taking up to five days in some locales. However, residents reported outages lasting longer than stated with one community remaining dark as of October 4. Repairs to roadways were expected to take at least five months.

== Meteorological history ==
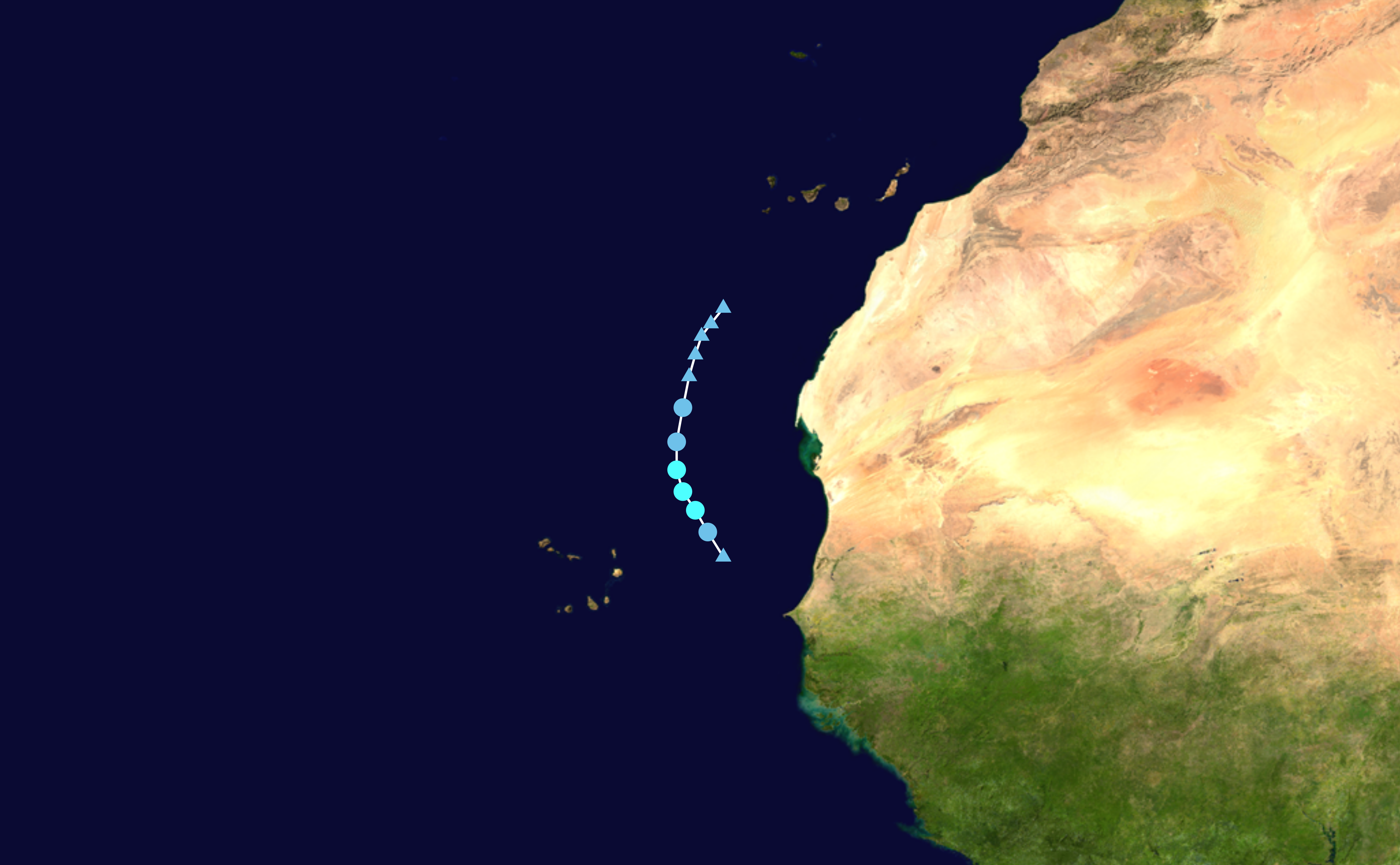
Map plotting the storm's track and intensity, according to the Saffir–Simpson scale Map key Saffir–Simpson scale Tropical depression (≤38 mph, ≤62 km/h) Tropical storm (39–73 mph, 63–118 km/h) Category 1 (74–95 mph, 119–153 km/h) Category 2 (96–110 mph, 154–177 km/h) Category 3 (111–129 mph, 178–208 km/h) Category 4 (130–156 mph, 209–251 km/h) Category 5 (≥157 mph, ≥252 km/h) Unknown Storm type Tropical cyclone Subtropical cyclone Extratropical cyclone, remnant low, tropical disturbance, or monsoon depression

On September 20, 2022, the National Hurricane Center (NHC) began monitoring a tropical wave over West Africa for possible tropical cyclogenesis. Traveling west, the wave eventually emerged over the far eastern Atlantic Ocean on September 22. With favorable environmental conditions, including high sea surface temperatures, sufficient atmospheric moisture and instability, steady development was anticipated. Scattered convection, some of it intense, accompanied the system. A broad area of low pressure consolidated within this wave early on September 23. The low moved north-northwest in response to a break in the eastern Atlantic subtropical ridge created by an upper-level trough. Throughout the day, convection organized into banding patterns and the low's center became more defined. In light of the increased organization, the NHC classified the system as Tropical Depression Ten at 12:00 UTC with the cyclone centered 470 km (290 mi) east-northeast of the Cabo Verde Islands. A burst of convection on the cyclone's eastern side signaled the depression's intensification into a tropical storm late on September 23. Upon attaining gale-force winds, the NHC assigned it the name Hermine. Its maximum sustained winds peaked at 65 km/h (40 mph) and pressure bottomed out at 1,003 hPa (29.62 inHg) Aircraft reconnaissance from NASA's Convective Processes Experiment-Cabo Verde recorded a central pressure of 1,006 hPa (29.71 inHg) several hours later just outside the center, providing evidence for this estimation.

Modest water warmth and moderate wind shear produced by the trough north of the cyclone gave Hermine limited time to intensify before moving into an increasingly hostile environment on September 24. The shear pushed dry, dusty air from the Saharan Air Layer into Hermine's circulation, inhibiting any further organization. The storm's surface circulation became increasingly separated to the west-southwest of the primary convection. By 12:00 UTC, Hermine had degraded into a tropical depression with all its remaining convection situated far to the northeast over the Canary Islands. Sputtering convection remained during this time before the cyclone collapsed and degenerated into a remnant low around 00:00 UTC on September 25; it was situated about 760 km (470 mi) west-southwest of the Canary Islands. The residual low continued toward the northeast before opening up into a trough by 06:00 UTC on September 26, marking its dissipation.

The cyclone's formation northeast of Cabo Verde is unusual, with only a handful of recorded instances within the Atlantic hurricane database dating back to 1851. Hermine's particular track and effect in the Canary Islands is regarded as one without precedent according to the Institute of Oceanography and Global Change and the State Meteorological Agency. However, its relation to climate change could not be ascertained.

== Preparations and impact ==
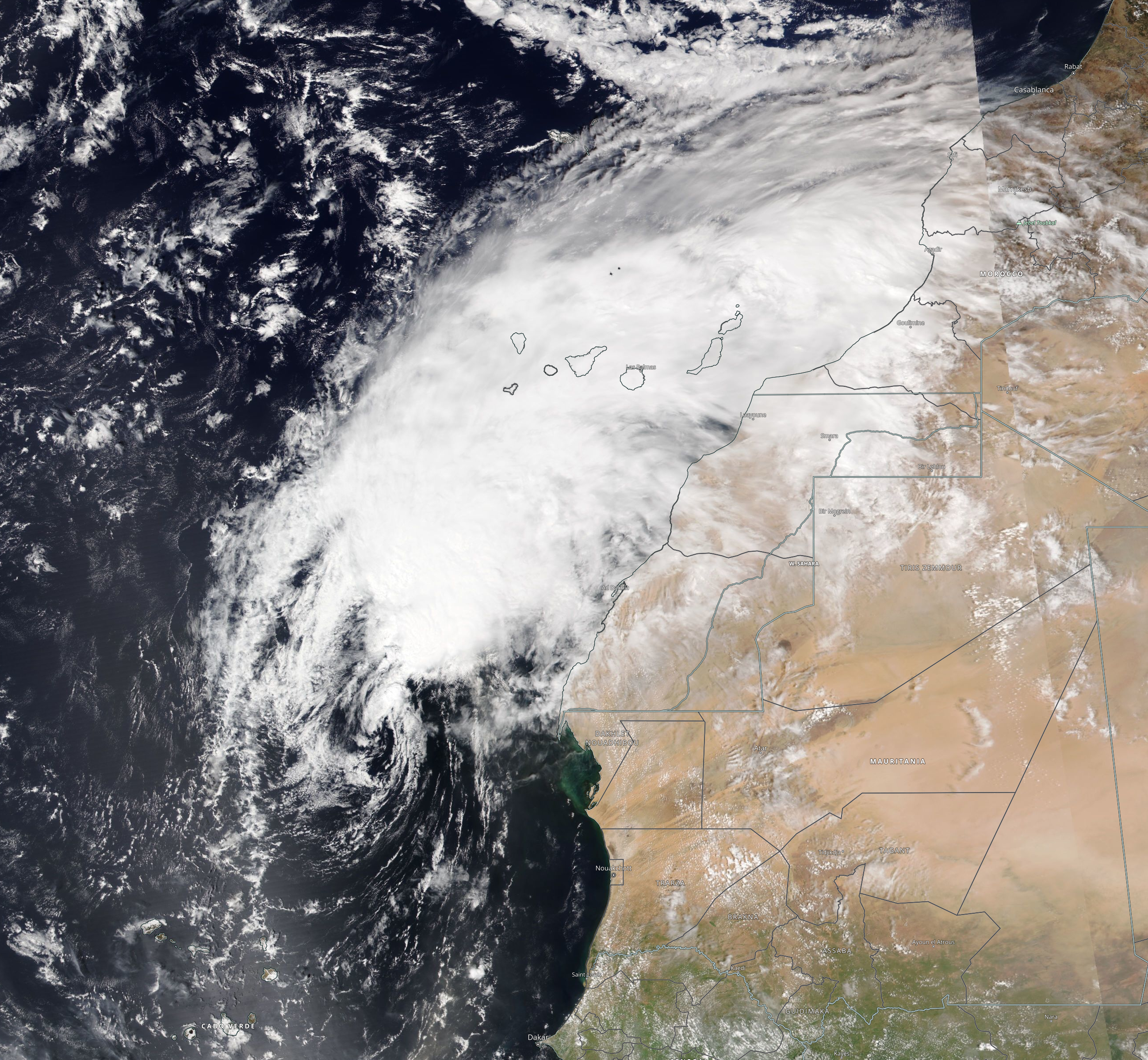
Strong wind shear displaced the bulk of Tropical Storm Hermine's convection (pictured on September 25) to the northeast of its circulation center, resulting in a prolonged period of heavy rainfall in the Canary Islands.

=== Morocco ===
Morocco's General Directorate of Meteorology issued warnings for heavy rain effective September 24 and 25. Rainfall was relatively light but proved beneficial to farmers starting their autumn crops.

=== Offshore incidents ===
Tracking close to West Africa, Hermine traversed part of the Atlantic Ocean known as the Canarian Route. This route is frequently used by migrants from several countries seeking to immigrate to the Canary Islands. Various media outlets attributed several incidents to the passage of Hermine; however, in the National Hurricane Center's post-storm report, no mention is made of these. An inflatable boat carrying 34 migrants from the Western Sahara set to sea around September 23. They soon encountered rough seas and all but one of the occupants died. The Miguel de Cervantes, operated by the Maritime Safety and Rescue Society, encountered the inflatable on October 1 about 278 km (173 mi) south of Gran Canaria, at which time they rescued the sole survivor and four bodies. The survivor suffered from hypothermia and was airlifted for medical assistance. Three other incidents occurred on September 24, necessitating the rescue of 104 people from two boats by the Maritime Safety and Rescue Society. On September 25, the Moroccan Navy rescued another 55 people stranded in rough seas. According to Salvamento Marítimo, several other boats left around the same time and have gone missing. The non-governmental organization Colectivo Caminando Fronteras (lit. "Walking Borders Collective") reported that 107 people were missing as of September 25.

=== Canary Islands ===
In anticipation of heavy rains, emergency services across the Canary Islands activated contingency plans to ensure public safety. The government issued their highest-level of warning on September 24 for heavy rain, wind, and flooding. Unlike the last tropical cyclone to impact the archipelago, Tropical Storm Delta in 2005 which caused extensive wind damage, the primary threat was rainfall. Total rainfall for the three-day period was forecast to equate to 10 to 15 times the normal monthly rainfall for September. Schools throughout the Canary Islands were closed through September 26. On Tenerife, the Department of Roads dispatched 125 workers to conduct spot-checks and clear incidents as they were reported. Incessant rain and low visibility prompted Binter Canarias to cancel all flights to and from Tenerife, La Gomera, El Hierro, and La Palma on September 25. A zero-rate policity was temporarily enacted by Eurocontrol. A total of 850 flights were disrupted throughout the duration of the storm.

"Historic" rainfall affected the archipelago for three days, leading to the Canary Islands seeing their wettest September on record. Elevated locations on the islands of El Hierro, Gran Canaria, La Palma, and Tenerife saw accumulations of 200–300 mm (8–12 in) or more. The highest totals were observed on La Palma, where a maximum of 530 mm (20.87 in) fell in San José within the Breña Baja municipality. A record-breaking 345 mm (13.6 in) fell in a single day; this constituted the greatest single-day rainfall event in the Canary Islands. This total is more than 20 times the normal precipitation seen for the month of September. Meteorological records extend back 106 years. Rainfall began in earnest on September 24, with the greatest totals occurring in mountainous areas. On that day, 70 mm (2.8 in) of rain was measured at Las Cañadas del Teide. Total rainfall at Tenerife North–Ciudad de La Laguna Airport reached 100 mm (3.9 in) on September 25 alone. Gran Canaria Airport observed 126 mm (4.96 in) during the event, equating to 83 percent of the annual precipitation. Similarly, Tenerife South Airport observed 104 mm (4.09 in), or 79 percent of its annual rainfall. Farther east, Lanzarote saw 48 mm (1.9 in) of precipitation, nearly half of its annual rainfall. Accumulations on Fuerteventura reached 60 mm (2.4 in), tripling the previous record for all of September.

Nearly 2,300 incidents were reported throughout the archipelago: 716 for power outages, 690 for landslides and road closures, and 648 for flooding. Of these reports, about 75 percent were in the Province of Las Palmas. Roughly 3,000 Endesa customers were left without power. The majority of the power outages occurred in Las Palmas, San Bartolomé de Tirajana, and Telde on Gran Canaria. Landslides rendered roads impassable, sewer drains overflowed, and flooding impacted communities. Some roads were washed out, saw collapsed retaining walls, or were otherwise damaged. Of the Canary Island's 1,081 schools, 192 suffered damage—primarily from water leaks and flooding—and 24 of these experienced severe damage However, all schools were opened on September 27. Fifty people required evacuation in San Bartolomé de Tirajana. Damage across Gran Canaria was estimated at 10 million euro (US$9.8 million), the majority of which was inccurred by road infrastructure. A kayaker was fined for illegally going outdoors during the storm in Santa Lucía de Tirajana and several hikers and scuba divers were ordered to return home. In Santa Cruz de Tenerife, eight homes were flooded and four homeless people required rescue. The roof of an abandoned home collapsed in the area as well.

== Aftermath ==
While the majority of roads were swiftly cleared of debris on Gran Canaria, portions of GC-1, GC-80, GC-301, GC-550, and GC-800 were severely damaged. The partial closure of the GC-1 led to significant traffic jams and repairs would not be completed for five months and would cost 1.2 million euros. Reconstruction of a collapsed retaining wall would take approximately three weeks. In Santa Cruz de Tenerife, seven roads remained closed four days after the rains ended. Endesa deployed more than 200 workers to restore power across the Canary Islands; service was fully restored on September 30. Some residents in less affluent parts of Tenerife expressed ire with poor responses or inaccurate times given for restoration from Endesa. More than 15,000 calls were made to the company during the event. In contrast to Endesa's statement, the city of Telde suffered power disruptions for more than a week after Hermine. The communities of El Calero, El Goro, Lomo de las Brujas, and San Borondón in particular were affected with the entirety of El Goro having no service as of October 4. Agriculture greatly benefited from Hermine's rainfall, with many farmers stating their crops would flourish from the well-timed precipitation. The lack of strong winds accompanying the storm mitigated the majority of crop damage, with only bananas suffering; however, flooding delayed harvests. Dams and reservoirs on Gran Canaria saw an influx of 2,700,000 litres (710,000 US gal) of water, ensuring agricultural stability for the next two years.

On October 7, the Telde City Council announced that 619,884 euro would be allocated for repair work with the bulk going toward road infrastructure.

== See also ==
- Weather of 2022
- Tropical cyclones in 2022
- List of West Africa hurricanes
- Other storms of the same name
- Tropical Storm Delta (2005) – impacted the Canary Islands
- Hurricane Pablo (2019) – easternmost Atlantic hurricane on record
