= Francisco de Bolaños =

16th-century Spanish explorer

Francisco de Bolaños was a Spanish explorer who most notably conducted an expedition in either 1541 or 1542 exploring the west coast of Mexico and the Baja California Peninsula. The maps produced during his expedition are thought to have had an influence on later names of places in the area.

== West Mexico and Baja Peninsula expedition ==
Around 1541, Bolaños was dispatched on a voyage up the west coast of Mexico and Baja California in service of Juan Rodríguez Cabrillo's expedition. The voyage was commissioned either by Cabrillo himself, or by the Viceroy of New Spain, Antonio de Mendoza, who had also commissioned the Cabrillo expedition. Bolaños embarked from the port of Navidad, where Cabrillo was preparing for his own departure. Bolaños followed the route of the previous expedition of Francisco de Ulloa, exploring both sides of the Baja California Peninsula, reaching approximately 200 miles north of Magdalena Bay, then returned to New Spain in late 1542. The maps Bolaños produced were used by Cabrillo in his landmark voyage of the Californian coast.

== Influence of Bolaños' maps ==
These maps appear to be the source of the names of several features of the South Californian area: Puerto de California, Puerto de San Lucas, Puerto de San Pedro, Baia de San Martin, Punta de Santa Catalina, and possibly Punta Abreojos. In particular, Bolaños' name for Puerto de California, located at the southern tip of the Peninsula near present-day Los Frailes, is one of the first uses of the name 'California,' and predates the term being used for the area at large by about 30 years. This suggests that Bolaños' expedition is the origin of the name. However, there are several competing theories, and no consensus exists among historians.
