= Punta Abreojos Airstrip =

Punta Abreojos
- IATA: AJS; ICAO: MX86; LID: AJS

Summary
- Airport type: Public
- Operator: N/A
- Serves: Punta Abreojos
- Location: Mulegé Municipality, Baja California Sur state, Mexico
- Elevation AMSL: 26 ft / 8 m
- Coordinates: 26°43′38″N 113°33′35″W
- Interactive map of Punta Abreojos

Runways
Direction	Length		Surface
Direction	ft	m	Surface
08/26	4,090	1,246	Soil
10/28	3,941	1,201	Soil

Punta Abreojos Airfield (IATA: AJS) is integrated by a pair of dirt airstrips located in Punta Abreojos, the Municipality of Mulegé, Baja California Sur state, Mexico.

Punta Abreojos is a fishing town located on the Pacific Ocean coast.

The airstrip is used solely for general aviation purposes, especially for medical and tourist (fishing and surfing) activities.
