= Punta Abreojos =

- Location within Baja California Sur Location within Mexico
- Coordinates: 26°42′52″N 113°34′20″W
- Country: Mexico
- State: Baja California Sur
- Municipality: Mulegé

Punta Abreojos is a fishing town in the municipality of Mulegé, Baja California Sur, Mexico.

It is located at the entrance to Laguna La Bocana, and is close to Estero Coyote.]s. An isolated hill, 95 metres (312 ft) high, rises a few miles behind the town, and is a conspicuous landmark for sailors. Several lighthouses are situated near the town.

The origin of the name Punta Abreojos is unclear. Some suggest it was named by Francisco de Bolaños, whose expedition reached the headland, but no further. Abreojos means "open your eyes", and refers to the treacherous sailing conditions, with many rocks and reefs. Numerous maps from the 17th century label the rocks offshore "The Briars" or "Los Abrojos" which refers to thorns, caltrops, or submerged rocks - these names for the point or its offshore rocks long predate the name Punta Abreojos, but make for a likely origin of that name. A similar set of rocks off the Western Australian shore are called "Houtman Abrolhos" as "abrolhos" in Portuguese means the same thing as "abrojos" in Spanish, either thorns or specifically plants in the genus Tribulus (which have extremely thorny seeds). Coincidentally, a non-native Tribulus is now a common weed around the town of Punta Abreojos and the offshore rocks are now an important destination for local fishermen.

Punta Abreojos is reached by driving west from the Transpeninsular Highway for about 80km of scenic desert and salt pans. The town comprises 500 houses, some grocery stores, an unofficial airstrip, a fish processing plant, several hardware stores, a church, schools and a medical clinic. The town's main economic output is in fishing for California spiny lobster and abalone.

== Climate ==
Climate data for Punta Abreojos (1991–2020 normals, extremes 1956–present)
Month	Jan	Feb	Mar	Apr	May	Jun	Jul	Aug	Sep	Oct	Nov	Dec	Year
Record high °C (°F)	40 (104)	39 (102)	39 (102)	40 (104)	40 (104)	42 (108)	42.5 (108.5)	45.5 (113.9)	45 (113)	47 (117)	40 (104)	39.5 (103.1)	47 (117)
Mean daily maximum °C (°F)	21.9 (71.4)	22.3 (72.1)	24.3 (75.7)	25.9 (78.6)	27.1 (80.8)	29.4 (84.9)	32.6 (90.7)	34.6 (94.3)	34.0 (93.2)	31.3 (88.3)	27.3 (81.1)	22.3 (72.1)	27.8 (82.0)
Daily mean °C (°F)	16.0 (60.8)	16.5 (61.7)	18.3 (64.9)	19.5 (67.1)	20.4 (68.7)	22.5 (72.5)	25.5 (77.9)	27.4 (81.3)	26.9 (80.4)	24.4 (75.9)	20.7 (69.3)	16.5 (61.7)	21.2 (70.2)
Mean daily minimum °C (°F)	10.2 (50.4)	10.6 (51.1)	12.2 (54.0)	13.0 (55.4)	13.7 (56.7)	15.5 (59.9)	18.5 (65.3)	20.2 (68.4)	19.8 (67.6)	17.5 (63.5)	14.2 (57.6)	10.6 (51.1)	14.7 (58.5)
Record low °C (°F)	−2 (28)	0 (32)	1 (34)	1 (34)	1 (34)	6 (43)	8 (46)	5 (41)	5.5 (41.9)	5 (41)	2 (36)	−5 (23)	−5 (23)
Average precipitation mm (inches)	8.4 (0.33)	11.7 (0.46)	3.5 (0.14)	0.0 (0.0)	0.0 (0.0)	0.0 (0.0)	0.0 (0.0)	4.2 (0.17)	6.1 (0.24)	2.0 (0.08)	4.0 (0.16)	10.4 (0.41)	50.3 (1.98)
Average rainy days	1.9	1.7	0.6	0.1	0.0	0.0	0.4	0.5	0.7	1.1	1.5	1.7	10.2
Source: Servicio Meteorológico Nacional

== See also ==
- Punta Abreojos Airstrip
- History of the west coast of North America

== Bibliography ==
- Paul A. Myers (2004). North to California: the Spanish voyages of discovery, 1533–1603. Llumina Press. ISBN 978-1-59526-251-6.
- National Geospatial-Intelligence Agency (2004). "Mexico – West Coast of Baja California". West Coasts of Mexico and Central America Enroute. Prostar Sailing Directions (10th ed.). ProStar Publications. pp. 7–20. ISBN 978-1-57785-559-0. Pub. 153.
- Danny Palmerlee (2007). "Península Vizcaíno". Baja California & Los Cabos (7th ed.). Lonely Planet. pp. 160–162. ISBN 978-1-74104-564-2.
- Patricia Rains (2006). "San Roque through Magdalena Bay". Mexico Boating Guide (2nd ed.). Point Loma Publishing. pp. 53–66. ISBN 978-0-9638470-5-8.
