= Tropical Storm Christine (1973) =

Atlantic tropical storm in 1973

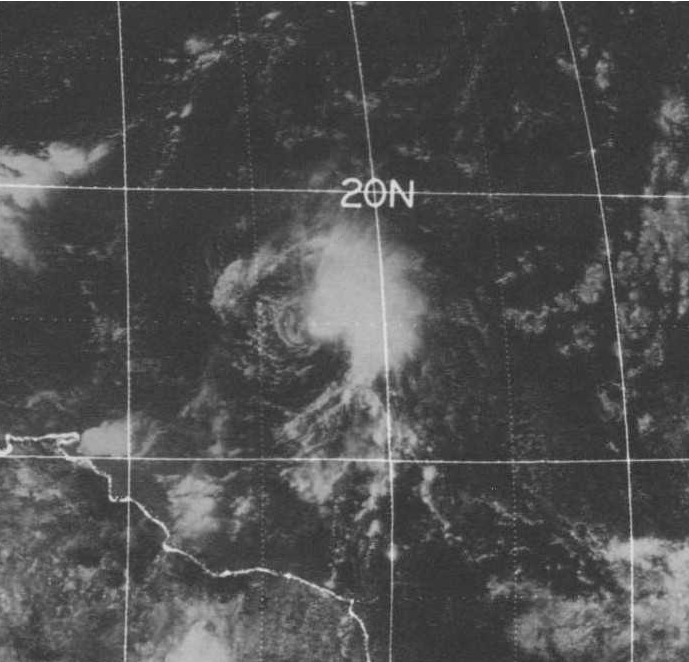
- Satellite image of Tropical Storm Christine on September 1, 1973

Meteorological history
- Formed: August 26, 1973
- Remnant low: September 4, 1973
- Dissipated: September 6, 1973

Tropical storm
- 1-minute sustained (SSHWS/NWS)
- Highest winds: 60 mph (95 km/h)
- Lowest pressure: 999 mbar (hPa); 29.50 inHg

Overall effects
- Fatalities: 1 indirect
- Areas affected: Leeward Islands and Puerto Rico
- IBTrACS
- Part of the 1973 Atlantic hurricane season

Tropical Storm Christine was the first tropical cyclone to form farther east than the longitude 30° W in the Atlantic Ocean since Tropical Storm Ginger in 1967. Forming as a tropical depression near the country of Guinea on August 26, 1973, the system tracked nearly due west for several days before intensifying into a tropical storm on August 28. However, the National Hurricane Center did not issue their first advisory on the system until its intensity was confirmed by a reconnaissance aircraft on August 30. Turning slightly northward, Christine gradually intensified, attaining its peak strength on September 2. At that time, the storm had winds of 60 mph (110 km/h) and a minimum pressure of 999 mbar (hPa; 29.41 inHg). Shortly after, increasing wind shear caused the system to quickly weaken. By September 4, Christine had been downgraded to a tropical depression as it tracked through the Leeward Islands. After degenerating into a tropical wave, the cyclone's remnants fully dissipated on September 6.

Although Christine had weakened to a tropical depression by the time it passed through the Leeward Islands, heavy rains from the storm, peaking at 11.74 in (298 mm), caused flooding in Puerto Rico. Over 600 homes were flooded and dozens of families had to be evacuated from several towns. One person died from electrocution after stepping on a downed wire on a flooded street. Minor damage was recorded in the Virgin Islands, mainly downed power lines which left roughly 500 people without telephone service.

== Meteorological history ==
Map plotting the storm's track and intensity, according to the Saffir–Simpson scale Map key Saffir–Simpson scale Tropical depression (≤38 mph, ≤62 km/h) Tropical storm (39–73 mph, 63–118 km/h) Category 1 (74–95 mph, 119–153 km/h) Category 2 (96–110 mph, 154–177 km/h) Category 3 (111–129 mph, 178–208 km/h) Category 4 (130–156 mph, 209–251 km/h) Category 5 (≥157 mph, ≥252 km/h) Unknown Storm type Tropical cyclone Subtropical cyclone Extratropical cyclone, remnant low, tropical disturbance, or monsoon depression

Tropical Storm Christine originated from a tropical wave over Africa in late-August. As it neared the Atlantic Ocean, the wave spawned a tropical depression at 15.6°W, near the country of Guinea, on August 26. The formation of this depression was farther east than any other tropical cyclone on record in the Atlantic hurricane basin. Tracking nearly due west, the depression moved over water several hours later and bypassed the Cape Verde Islands on August 27.

The following day, the depression intensified into a tropical storm; however, advisories were not issued by the National Hurricane Center (NHC) on the system until August 30 because of the lack of reconnaissance aircraft data. It was determined that Christine had become a tropical storm by this time after receiving reports of gale-force winds from a German cargo ship in the vicinity of the storm. The first advisory from the NHC came after a reconnaissance plane found sustained winds of 50 mph (85 km/h) and a barometric pressure of 1007 mbar (hPa; 29.74 inHg). At that time, Christine was located roughly 1000 mi (1,500 km) east of Trinidad. Although the storm was relatively disorganized by this point, satellite imagery showed large outer bands extending hundreds of miles (kilometres) from the storm.

By August 31, the storm began to slow and turn towards the west-northwest. The NHC noted that they did not have a firm grip on the storm and were unsure of its future track and intensity. Below average sea surface temperatures ahead of the system would hamper significant development. Continuing on this track, Christine gradually intensified and on September 2, the storm attained its peak intensity just below hurricane-status while situated roughly 300 mi (500 km) east of Guadeloupe. At this time, a reconnaissance aircraft recorded sustained winds of 60 mph (110 km/h) and a minimum pressure of 999 mbar (hPa; 29.41 inHg). Shortly after Christine attained this intensity, increasing wind shear caused the storm to weaken as it neared the Leeward Islands.

The NHC noted that a trough ahead of Christine would determine the future of the storm. This trough would either merge with the storm and allow significant intensification, or remain separate and cause Christine to dissipate. By September 3, the low-level circulation had been displaced from all convective activity and Christine weakened to a tropical depression. Several hours after weakening, the depression passed over Antigua with winds of 35 mph (55 km/h). The following day, the system degenerated into a tropical wave near the northeastern coast of the Dominican Republic. The remnants of Christine were monitored by the NHC for several days before dissipating near the trough on September 6.

=== Observation ===
Throughout its existence, Christine was monitored by astronauts in the Skylab 3 project. During this project, active and passive microwave satellite imagery was used for the first time to determine the wind speed within a tropical cyclone. This was accomplished after the removal of regions of heavy rain from the data, a factor that gives inaccurate wind readings.

== Preparations and impact ==
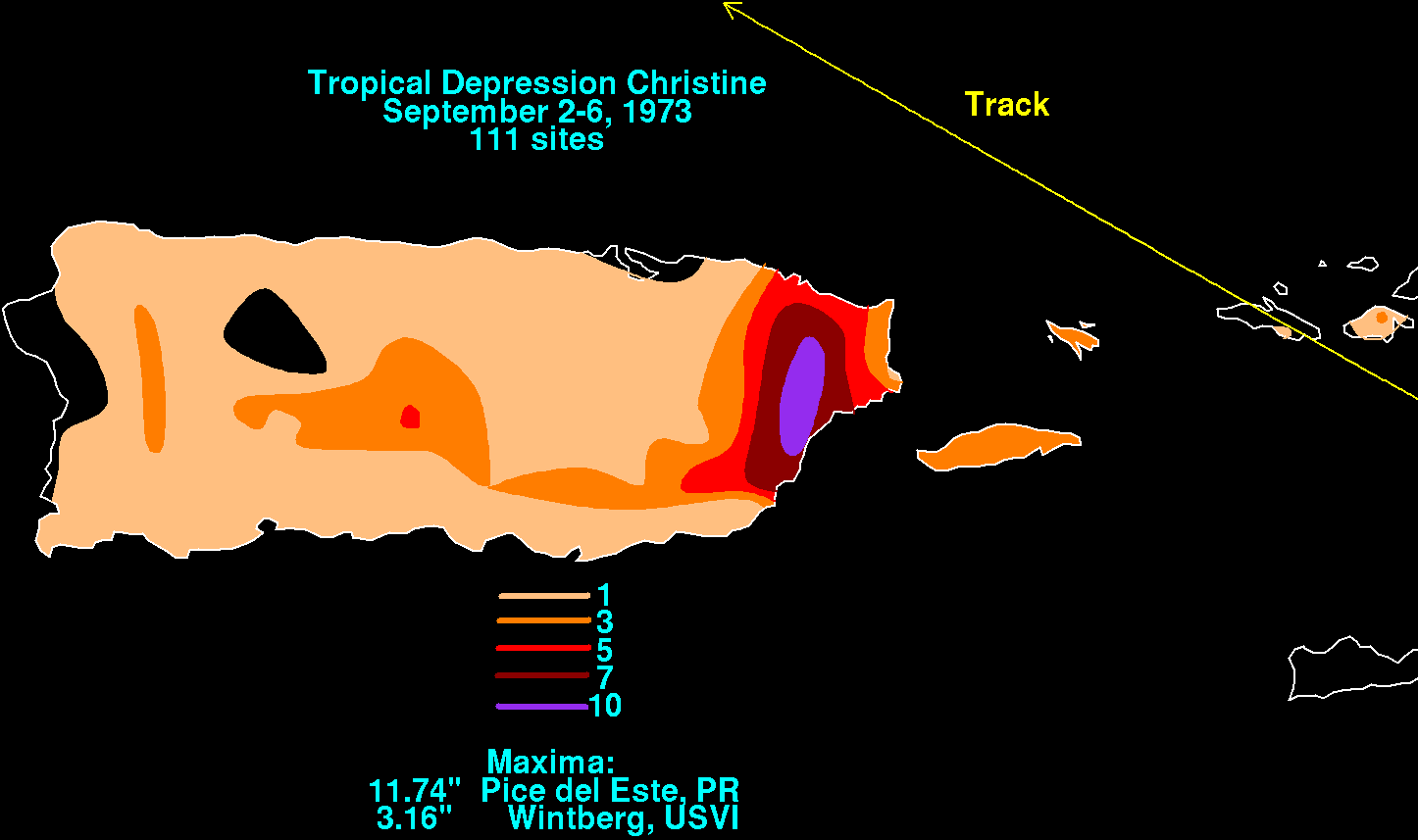
Rainfall from Tropical Storm Christine in Puerto Rico and the United States Virgin Islands

On September 2, the National Hurricane Center issued gale warnings and hurricane watches for Guadeloupe, Desirade, Antigua and Barbuda. Later that day, the gale warnings were expanded southward to include islands north of Dominica. After Christine weakened to a tropical depression, the NHC discontinued all watches and warnings for the Leeward Islands. Schools were closed in Puerto Rico and the United States Virgin Islands as a precaution. Six scientists had to be evacuated from the small island of Aves once the storm posed a threat to them. On St. Thomas, nine emergency shelters were opened, mainly in schools. On September 5, an emergency meeting was held by disaster officials in Puerto Rico about the threat of flooding from Christine. All residents were urged by government officials to have their disaster kits ready and be prepared to evacuate if told to do so. Firefighters, on and off-duty, were advised about the possibility of evacuations and would be pulled into work if needed.

As it passed through the Leeward Islands, Christine produced torrential rainfall, peaking at 11.74 in (298 mm) in eastern Puerto Rico. A maximum of 3.16 in (80 mm) also fell in the United States Virgin Islands. The precipitation led to flooding on several islands. One person was killed during the storm after being electrocuted by a downed power line on a flooded road. Public works crews worked throughout the storm to keep roads clear; however, one road that was under construction became a "sea of mud" as crews could not clear the flood waters fast enough. The towns of Yabucoa, Humacao, Maunabo, Las Piedras and Carolina sustained flood damage from the storm. In Yabucoa, 40 families were evacuated as 25 homes were damaged. The most substantial flooding took place in Humacao where 60 families were evacuated and 500 homes sustained damage. Six bridges, four sewer systems and 14 homes were damaged in Maunabo. An additional 21 people were evacuated from Las Piedras and 41 homes were damaged and in Carolinas, 23 more homes were damaged. Numerous calls were made to police in the United States Virgin Islands about downed power lines throughout the passage of the depression. High winds, gusting up to 40 mph (65 km/h) left roughly 500 people without telephone service on St. Croix. The storm's remnants produced squally weather in Florida on September 7 and 8.

== See also ==
- Hurricane Danny (2015) – followed a path similar to that of Christine
- Brown ocean effect – the rare phenomenon when tropical cyclones form, intensify or hold their intensity for exceptionally long time periods while inland
