= Timeline of the 2015 Pacific typhoon season =

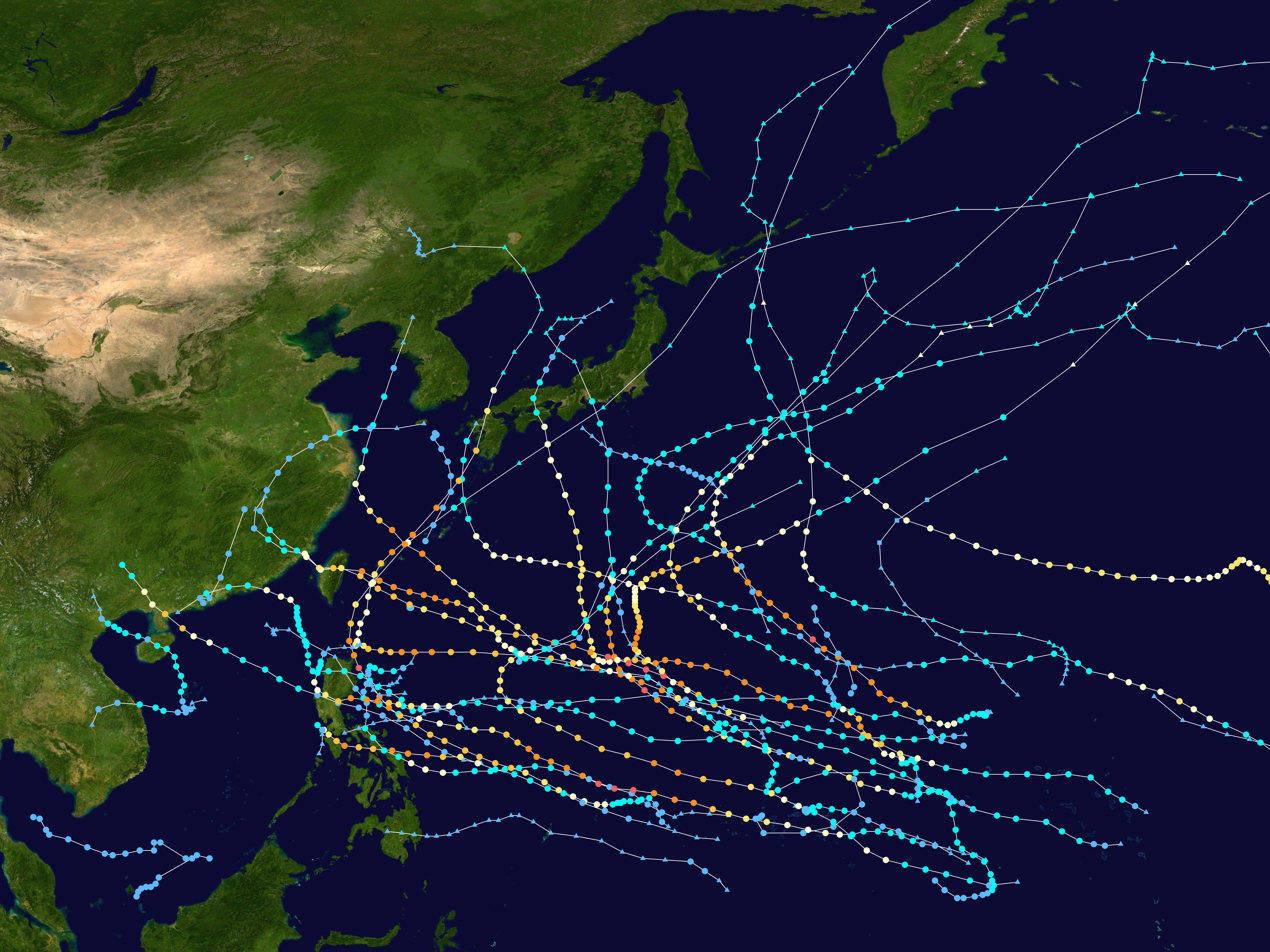
- Season summary map

Season boundaries
- First system formed: January 2, 2015
- Last system dissipated: December 23, 2015

Strongest system
- Name: Soudelor
- Maximum winds: 215 km/h (130 mph) (10-minute sustained)
- Lowest pressure: 900 hPa (mbar)

Longest lasting system
- Name: Nangka
- Duration: 16 days
Storm articles
- Tropical Storm Mekkhala (2015)
- Tropical Storm Bavi (2015)
- Typhoon Noul (2015)
- Typhoon Dolphin (2015)
- Tropical Storm Kujira (2015)
- Typhoon Chan-hom (2015)
- Tropical Storm Linfa (2015)
- Typhoon Nangka (2015)
- Typhoon Halola
- Typhoon Soudelor
- Typhoon Goni (2015)
- Tropical Storm Etau (2015)
- Tropical Storm Vamco (2015)
- Typhoon Dujuan (2015)
- Typhoon Mujigae
- Typhoon Koppu
- Typhoon Melor

The 2015 Pacific typhoon season had a relatively active tropical cyclone season, with its first five months being unusually active and intense due to a developing El Niño. During the season, a total of 36 systems were designated as Tropical Depressions, as determined by the following Meteorological organizations: the JMA; the PAGASA; the JTWC; or one of various other reporting agencies, such as the China Meteorological Administration, or the Hong Kong Observatory. Throughout the 2015 season, 13 systems entered or formed in the Philippine Area of Responsibility (PAR), with six of them making landfall directly over the Philippines.

This timeline documents tropical cyclone formations, strengthening, weakening, landfalls, extratropical transitions, and dissipations during the season in the Pacific Ocean, north of the equator between 100°E and the International Date Line. The time stamp for each event is stated using Coordinated Universal Time (UTC), the 24-hour clock where 00:00 = midnight UTC. Additionally, figures for maximum sustained winds and position estimates are rounded to the nearest 5 units (Kilometres or miles). Direct wind observations are rounded to the nearest whole number. Meteorological observations typically report atmospheric pressures are measured in hectopascals per the recommendation of the World Meteorological Organization, and the nearest hundredth of an inches of mercury or millibars (hectopascals).

== Timeline ==
=== January ===
January 2

- 06:00 UTC — The JMA reports that a tropical depression has developed to the northwest of Brunei, within an area that was marginally favourable for further development.

January 4

- 06:00 UTC — The tropical depression previously located to the northwest of Brunei is last noted by the JMA, as it dissipates in the South China Sea near the border of Malaysia and Indonesia.

January 13

- 15:00 UTC - The JTWC (Joint Typhoon Warning Center) (Note: The Joint Typhoon Warning Center is a joint United States Navy – United States Air Force task force that issues tropical cyclone warnings for the western Pacific Ocean and other regions.) monitors a tropical depression was designated as Tropical Depression 01W.

Mekkhala making landfall over the Philippines on January 17

January 14

- 06:00 UTC — 01W intensified into a tropical storm by the JMA (Japan Meteorological Agency) (Note: The Japan Meteorological Agency is the official Regional Specialized Meteorological Center for the western Pacific Ocean.), naming it Mekkhala.
- 21:00 UTC — Mekkhala entered the Philippine area of Responsibility (PAR), as it was named as Amang by the PAGASA.

January 15

- 03:00 UTC — The JTWC upgrades Mekkhala to a tropical storm.

January 16

- 12:00 UTC — According to the JMA, Mekkhala intensified into a severe tropical storm.

January 17

- 00:00 UTC — The JMA upgraded Mekkhala to a minimal typhoon and reached its peak intensity with 10-minute maximum sustained winds of 110 km/h (70 mph).
- 03:00 UTC — The JTWC in the other hand, classified Mekkhala's peak as a Category 1 typhoon with winds of 130 km/h (80 mph).
- 07:00 UTC — PAGASA had reported that Mekkhala (Amang) had made landfall over Dolores, Eastern Samar of the Philippines.
- 09:00 UTC — Both the JMA and the JTWC downgraded the system to a tropical storm.

January 18

- 15:00 UTC — The JTWC downgraded Mekkhala to a tropical depression.
- 18:00 UTC — Mekkhala had fully weakened into a tropical depression.

January 21

- 00:00 UTC — The JMA stopped warning on the system as it was absorbed by a stationary front over eastern Luzon.

=== February ===
February 7

- 06:00 UTC — The JTWC monitors a tropical depression was designated as Tropical Depression 02W.
- 15:00 UTC — The JTWC designates 02W to tropical Storm, as it started to intensify.
- 18:00 UTC — 02W intensified into a tropical storm by the JMA, naming it Higos whilst the JTWC also upgraded Higos to a tropical storm.

February 8

- 18:00 UTC — The JMA upgrades Higos to a severe tropical storm whilst the JTWC upgraded Higos to a Category 1 typhoon.

February 9

- 12:00 UTC — The JMA upgrades Higos to a typhoon whilst the JTWC upgraded Higos to a Category 2 typhoon.

Typhoon Higos undergoing rapid intensification

February 10

- 03:00 UTC — Higos starts to undergo rapid deepening as its eye became more clearer.
- 06:00 UTC — The JTWC classified Higos's peak as a Category 4 typhoon with winds of 215 km/h (130 mph).
- 12:00 UTC — The JTWC reports that Typhoon Higos has weakened and become equivalent to a Category 3 typhoon on the SSHWS.
- 18:00 UTC — The JTWC reports that Typhoon Higos has weakened and become equivalent to a Category 2 typhoon on the SSHWS.
- 21:00 UTC — The JMA reports that Typhoon Higos has weakened into a severe tropical storm.

February 11

- 00:00 UTC — The JMA reports that Severe Tropical Storm Higos has weakened into a tropical storm.
- 00:00 UTC — The JTWC reports that Typhoon Higos has weakened and become equivalent to a Category 1 typhoon on the SSHWS.
- 12:00 UTC — The JTWC downgraded Higos to a tropical depression.
- 18:00 UTC — Higos had fully weakened into a tropical depression.

February 13

- 06:00 UTC — The JMA stopped warning on the system as it was absorbed by a stationary front over eastern Mariana Islands.

=== March ===
March 10

- 06:00 UTC - The JMA starts monitoring a tropical depression that is located about 330 km (205 mi) to the northeast of Bairiki in Kiribati.

March 11

- 03:00 UTC — The tropical depression forms and was designated as 03W by the JTWC.
- 06:00 UTC — The JMA reports that the tropical depression has developed into a tropical storm.

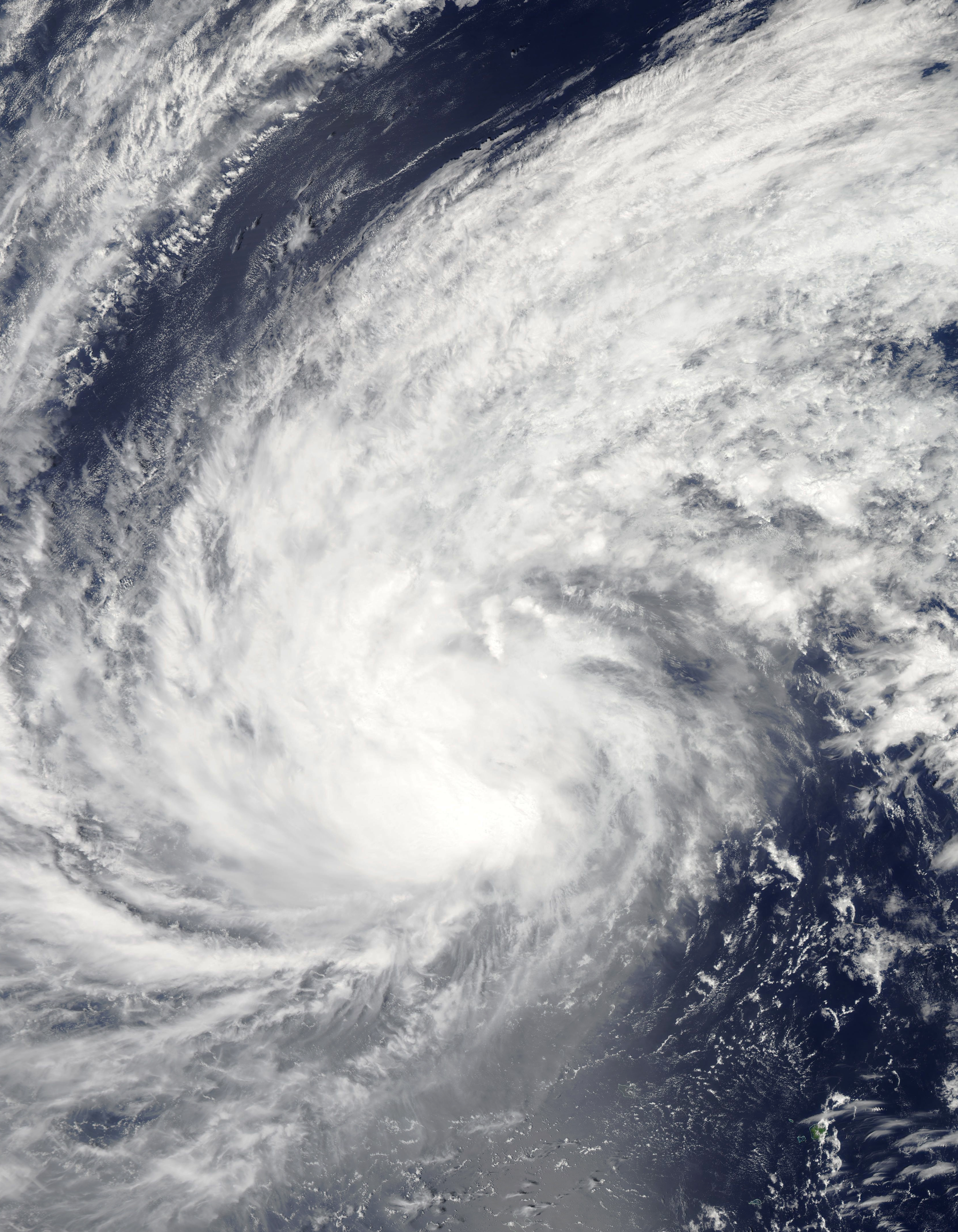
Tropical Storm Bavi at peak intensity on March 14

March 14

- 12:00 UTC — According to both agencies, Bavi had reached its peak strength as a strong tropical storm.

March 17

- 18:00 UTC — The PAGASA had reported that Bavi had entered their area, giving the name Betty.
- 21:00 UTC — All three agencies downgrade Bavi to a tropical depression, as moderate to high vertical wind shear caused Bavi's circulation to become exposed.

March 23

- 00:00 UTC — Tropical Depression Bavi (Betty) had fully dissipated west of Manila.

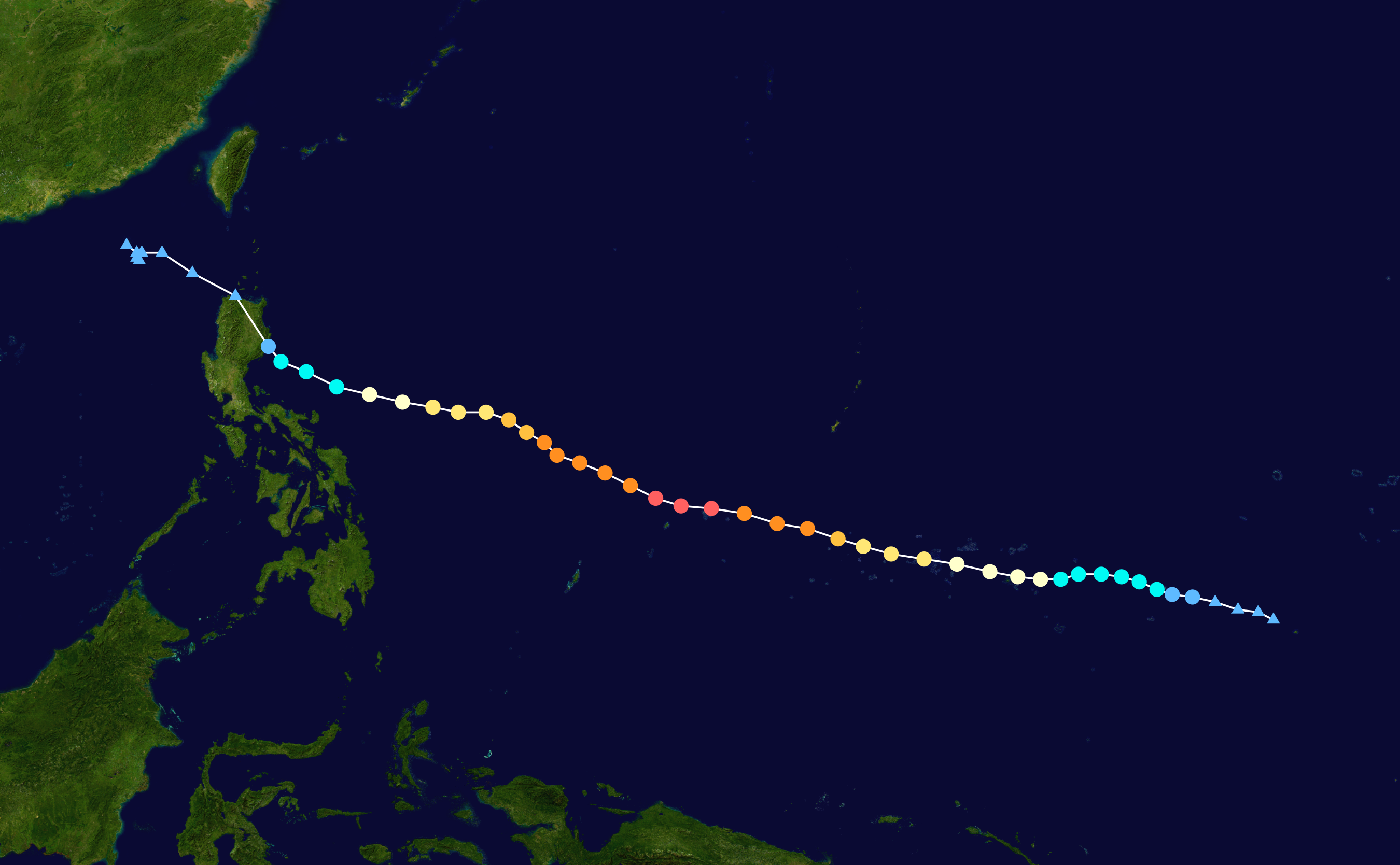
Track of Typhoon Maysak during late-March

March 27

- 03:00 UTC — The JTWC starts designating a tropical depression to 04W.
- 15:00 UTC — As of the JTWC, 04W intensified into a tropical storm.
- 18:00 UTC — The JMA followed suit of upgrading it. With this, it was named Maysak.

March 28

- 12:00 UTC — Maysak starts to show signs of a developing eye, as it was upgraded to a severe tropical storm by the JMA.
- 18:00 UTC — The JMA upgrades Maysak to a typhoon, even though the JTWC still classifies it as a tropical storm.
- 21:00 UTC — Finally, the JTWC upgrades Maysak to a Category 1 typhoon.

March 29

- 18:00 UTC — Maysak intensifies into a Category 2 typhoon as it starts to develop a ragged eye.

March 30

- 06:00 UTC — Maysak starts to undergo rapid deepening as its eye became more clearer.
- 18:00 UTC — Due to more favorable environments for the storm, the JTWC upgraded Maysak to a Category 4 super typhoon, as the typhoon strengthened in size as well.

March 31

- 09:00 UTC — The JTWC upgrades Maysak to a Category 5 super typhoon with 1-minute sustained winds of 260 km/h (160 mph).

=== April ===
April 1

- 06:00 UTC — The JTWC reports that Typhoon Maysak has weakened and become equivalent to a Category 4 super typhoon on the SSHWS.
- 15:00 UTC — Maysak enters the PAR, with PAGASA naming it as Chedeng.
- 18:00 UTC — The JTWC reports that Typhoon Maysak has weakened and become equivalent to a Category 4 typhoon on the SSHWS.

April 2

- 12:00 UTC — The JTWC reports that Typhoon Maysak has weakened and become equivalent to a Category 3 typhoon on the SSHWS.

April 3

- 00:00 UTC — The JTWC reports that Typhoon Maysak has weakened and become equivalent to a Category 2 typhoon on the SSHWS.
- 03:00 UTC — Tropical Depression 05W develops from a cluster of clouds east of the Caroline Islands and over favorable conditions.
- 18:00 UTC — The JTWC reports that Typhoon Maysak has weakened and become equivalent to a Category 1 typhoon on the SSHWS.

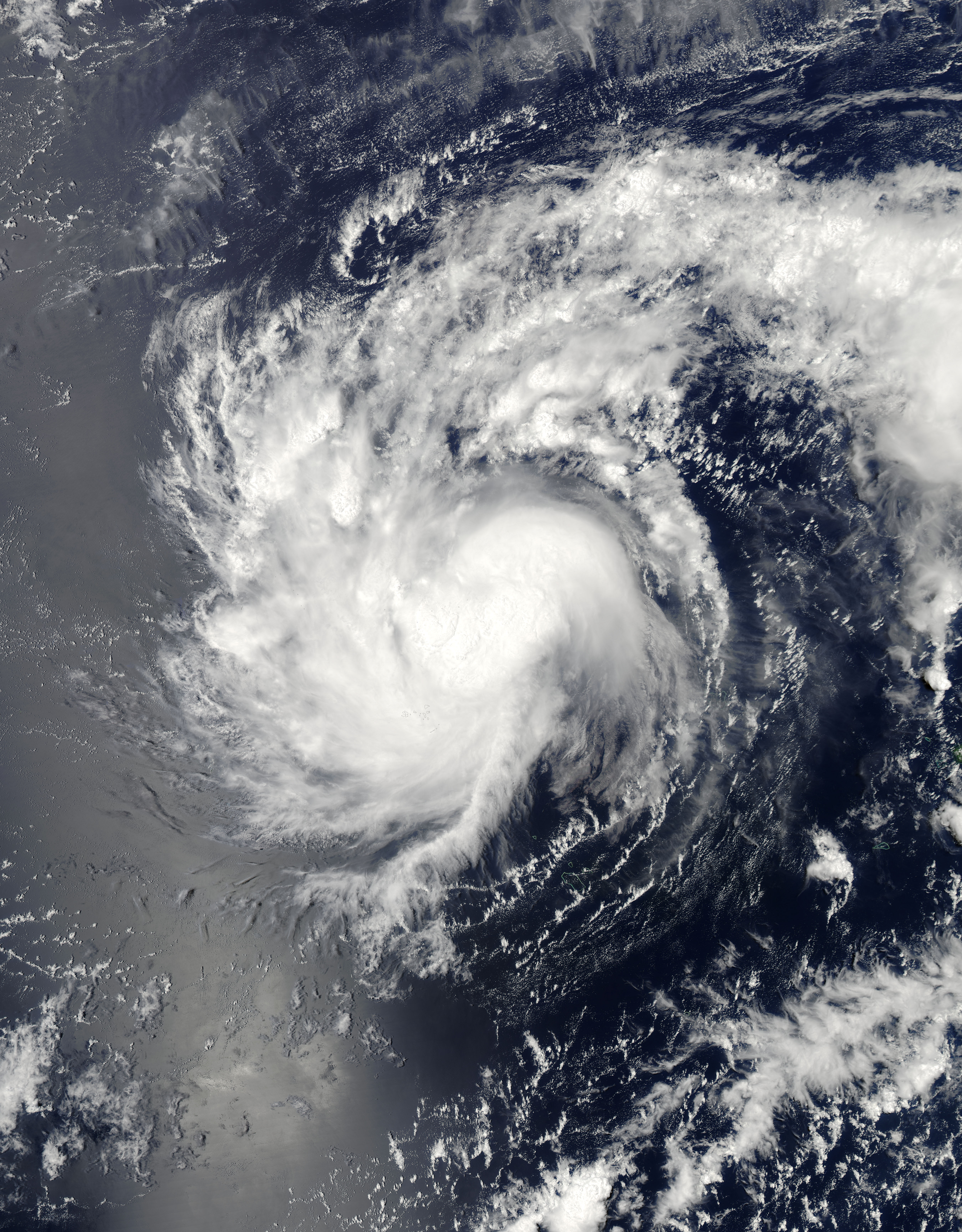
Tropical Depression 05W intensifies into Tropical Storm Haishen on April 4

April 4

- 03:00 UTC — According to the JTWC, 05W had intensified into a tropical storm.
- 03:00 UTC — In the same time, the JMA started issuing advisories on 05W.
- 06:00 UTC — The JMA reports that Typhoon Maysak has weakened into a severe tropical storm.
- 07:00 UTC — The JMA had stated that 05W had intensified into Tropical Storm Haishen.
- 12:00 UTC — The JTWC reports that Typhoon Maysak has weakened to a tropical storm.
- 18:00 UTC — The JMA reports that Severe Tropical Storm Maysak has weakened into a tropical storm.

April 5

- 06:00 UTC — The JMA downgrades Maysak to a tropical depression, whilst the JTWC still classifies it as a weak tropical storm.
- 18:00 UTC — The JTWC issues its final advisory on Typhoon Maysak as it has weakened into a tropical depression.

April 6

- 12:00 UTC — The JMA stops warning on Haishen, as it was downgraded to a low-pressure area.

April 7

- 21:00 UTC — The JMA stops tracking on Tropical Depression Maysak as it was last located over the South China Sea.

=== May ===
May 2

- 06:00 UTC — The JMA starts to monitor a tropical depression that was located to the east of Palau.

May 3

- 00:00 UTC — The JTWC starts issuing advisories on the depression as they upgraded it to Tropical Depression 06W.
- 18:00 UTC — Tropical Depression 06W intensifies into Tropical Storm Noul.
- 20:00 UTC — The JTWC reports that Tropical Depression 06W has intensified to a tropical storm.

May 5

- 18:00 UTC — Tropical Storm Noul intensified into a severe tropical storm by the JMA.

May 6

- 06:00 UTC — The JMA starts to monitor a new tropical depression just north of the equator near Pohnpei.
- 06:00 UTC — Noul intensifies into a typhoon by the JMA.
- 12:00 UTC — The JTWC upgraded Noul to a Category 1 typhoon.
- 20:00 UTC — Noul enters the PAR, as PAGASA names it Dodong.
- 21:00 UTC — The JTWC starts issuing advisories on the new depression and designates it as 07W.

May 7

- 00:00 UTC — The JTWC reports that Typhoon Noul has intensified and become equivalent to a Category 2 typhoon on the SSHWS.
- 12:00 UTC — The JTWC reports that Typhoon Noul has intensified and become equivalent to a Category 3 typhoon on the SSHWS.

May 9

- 12:00 UTC — The JMA upgrades 07W to Tropical Storm Dolphin.
- 12:00 UTC — The JTWC reports that Typhoon Noul has intensified and become equivalent to a Category 4 typhoon on the SSHWS.
- 18:00 UTC — The JTWC reports that Typhoon Noul has intensified and become equivalent to a Category 4 super typhoon on the SSHWS.

Typhoon Noul making landfall over the Philippines on May 10

May 10

- 00:00 UTC — Both the JMA and the JTWC reports that Typhoon Noul had reached its peak intensity as a Category 5 super typhoon with 10-minute sustained windspeeds of 205 km/h (125 mph), which is the strongest this year in terms of windspeeds. .
- 07:00 UTC — PAGASA had reported that Noul (Dodong) made landfall over Santa Ana, Cagayan of the Philippines.
- 12:00 UTC — The JTWC reports that Typhoon Noul has weakened and become equivalent to a Category 4 super typhoon on the SSHWS.
- 18:00 UTC — The JTWC reports that Typhoon Noul has weakened and become equivalent to a Category 4 typhoon on the SSHWS.

May 11

- 00:00 UTC — The JTWC reports that Typhoon Noul has weakened and become equivalent to a Category 3 typhoon on the SSHWS.
- 06:00 UTC — The JTWC reports that Typhoon Noul has weakened and become equivalent to a Category 2 typhoon on the SSHWS.
- 12:00 UTC — The JTWC reports that Typhoon Noul has weakened and become equivalent to a Category 1 typhoon on the SSHWS.

May 12

- 00:00 UTC — The JTWC reports that Typhoon Noul has weakened to a tropical storm.
- 03:00 UTC — The JMA reports that Typhoon Noul has weakened into a severe tropical storm.
- 06:00 UTC — Both the JMA and the JTWC issues their final advisory on Typhoon Noul as it has transitioned into an extratropical cyclone.

May 13

- 00:00 UTC — The JTWC upgrades Dolphin to a Category 1 typhoon.
- 06:00 UTC — The JMA upgrades Dolphin to a typhoon.
- 12:00 UTC — The JTWC upgraded Dolphin to a Category 2 typhoon.

May 15

- 18:00 UTC — The JTWC reports that Typhoon Dolphin has intensified and become equivalent to a Category 3 typhoon on the SSHWS.

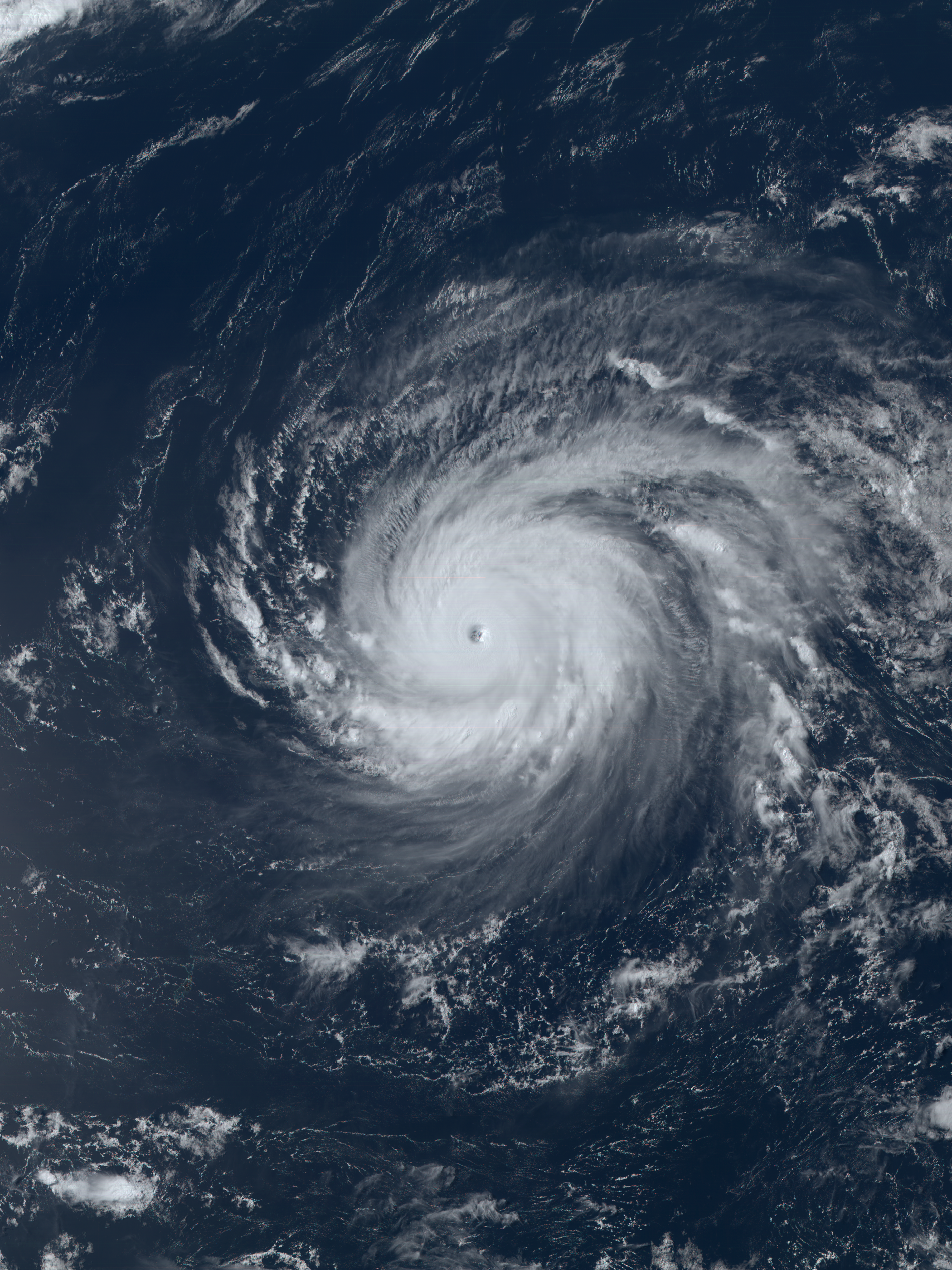
Typhoon Dolphin intensifying on May 16

May 16

- 00:00 UTC — The JTWC reports that Typhoon Dolphin has intensified and become equivalent to a Category 4 typhoon on the SSHWS.
- 06:00 UTC — The JTWC reports that Typhoon Dolphin has intensified and become equivalent to a Category 4 super typhoon on the SSHWS.
- 09:00 UTC — The JMA reports that Typhoon Dolphin has reached its peak intensity, with 10-minute sustained windspeeds of 185 km/h (115 mph).
- 18:00 UTC — The JTWC reports that Typhoon Dolphin has intensified and become equivalent to a Category 5 super typhoon on the SSHWS.

May 17

- 06:00 UTC — The JTWC reports that Typhoon Dolphin has weakened and become equivalent to a Category 4 super typhoon on the SSHWS.
- 18:00 UTC — The JTWC reports that Typhoon Dolphin has weakened and become equivalent to a Category 4 typhoon on the SSHWS.

May 18

- 00:00 UTC — The JTWC reports that Typhoon Dolphin has weakened and become equivalent to a Category 3 typhoon on the SSHWS.
- 12:00 UTC — The JTWC reports that Typhoon Dolphin has weakened and become equivalent to a Category 2 typhoon on the SSHWS.
- 18:00 UTC — The JTWC reports that Typhoon Dolphin has weakened and become equivalent to a Category 1 typhoon on the SSHWS.

May 19

- 12:00 UTC — The JTWC issues its final advisory on Typhoon Dolphin as it has weakened below typhoon intensity and transitioned into an extratropical cyclone.

May 20

- 00:00 UTC — The JMA reports that Typhoon Dolphin has weakened into a severe tropical storm.
- 18:00 UTC — The JMA reports that Severe Tropical Storm Dolphin has transitioned into an extratropical cyclone.

=== June ===
June 19

- 18:00 UTC — The JMA reports that a tropical depression has developed within the South China Sea about 940 km (585 mi) to the southeast of Hanoi, Vietnam.

June 20

- 15:00 UTC — The JTWC classifies the tropical depression as Tropical Depression 08W.

June 21

- 00:00 UTC — The JMA reports that Tropical Depression 08W has intensified into a tropical storm and names it Kujira.
- 12:00 UTC — The JMA reports that Tropical Storm Kujira has peaked with 10-minute sustained wind speeds of 85 km/h (50 mph).

June 22

- 00:00 UTC — The JTWC reports that Kujira has intensified into a tropical storm.

June 23

- 00:00 UTC — The JTWC reports that Tropical Storm Kujira has weakened into a tropical depression, as it emerges into the Gulf of Tonkin after impacting Hainan island.
- 06:00 UTC — The JTWC reports that Tropical Depression Kujira has intensified into a tropical storm.

June 24

- 00:00 UTC — The JTWC reports that Tropical Storm Kujira has weakened into a tropical depression and issues its final advisory, after the weakening system made landfall to the east of Hanoi, Vietnam.
- 18:00 UTC — The JMA reports that Tropical Storm Kujira has weakened into a tropical depression over land.

June 25

- 06:00 UTC — The JMA reports that Tropical Depression Kujira has dissipated, over land to the north of Hanoi, Vietnam.

June 30

- 00:00 UTC — The JMA starts to monitor another tropical depression near Kosrae.

=== July ===
July 1

- 00:00 UTC — The JMA starts to monitor a tropical depression just east of Visayas, Philippines.
- 12:00 UTC — The JMA starts to monitor weak tropical depression over the Caroline Islands and southwest of Chan-hom.

July 2

- 03:00 UTC — The tropical depression near Visayas was monitored by the PAGASA, which gave the local name Egay.
- 03:00 UTC — Egay was then upgraded to Tropical Depression 10W by the JTWC.
- 06:00 UTC — The other tropical depression was absorbed by the nearby and intensifying Chan-hom.

July 3

- 00:00 UTC — Another tropical depression develops over the Marshall Islands, according to the JMA.
- 03:00 UTC — Both the JMA and JTWC downgrade Chan-hom to a strong tropical storm.
- 06:00 UTC — Linfa intensifies into a severe tropical storm.
- 12:00 UTC — The JTWC designates the tropical depression, 11W.
- 18:00 UTC — The JMA upgrades 11W to Tropical Storm Nangka.

July 6

- 06:00 UTC — The JTWC upgrades Nangka to a typhoon, as a ragged eye forms.

July 7

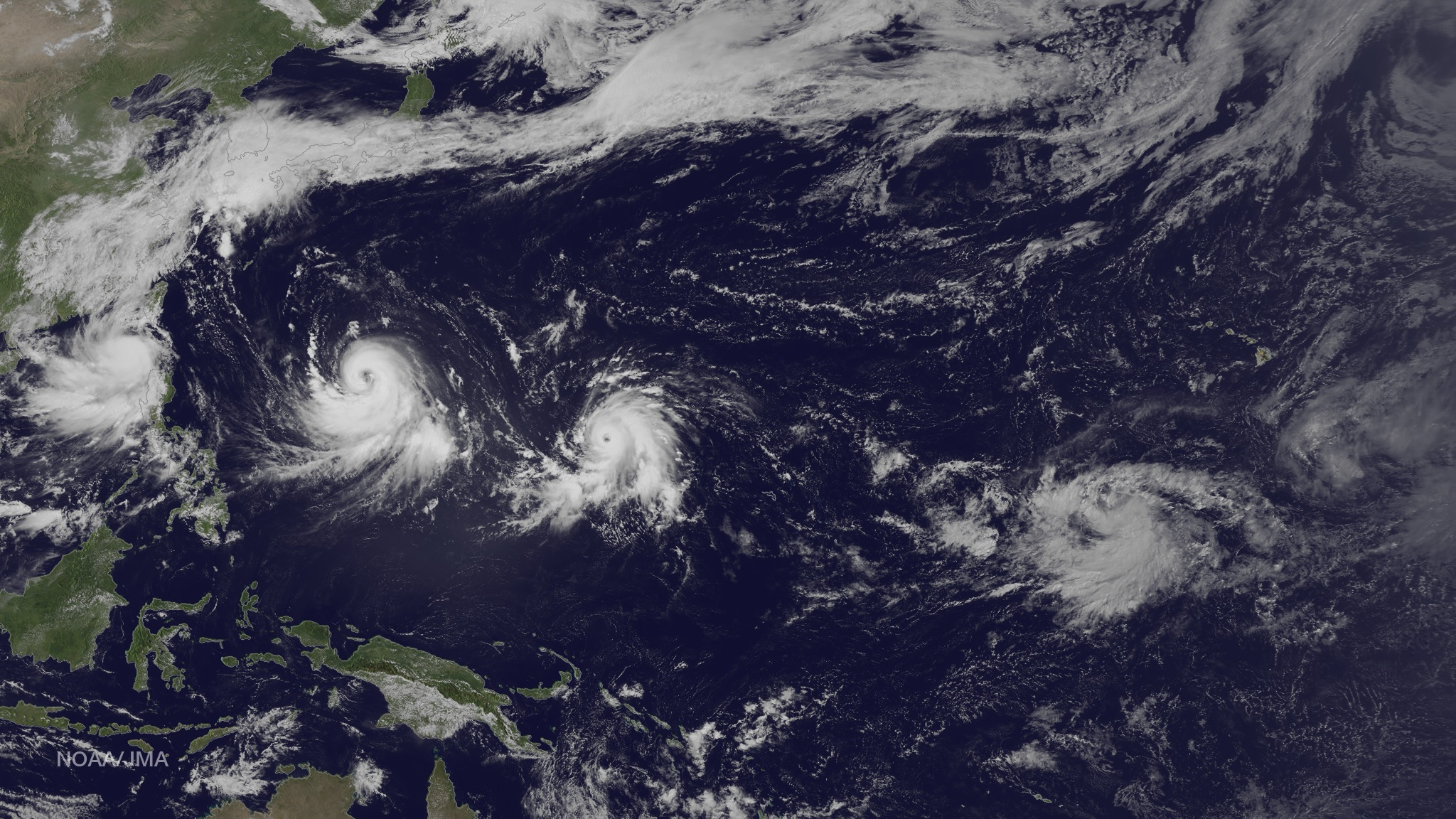
Three tropical cyclones simultaneously active in the Western Pacific; (from left to right) Linfa, Chan-hom and Nangka on July 7. 2 invests which soon to become Halola and Iune are also visible in the Central Pacific

- 15:00 UTC — Typhoon Chan-hom enters the PAR, with PAGASA assigning the local name Falcon.

July 8

- 18:00 UTC — The JTWC upgrades Linfa to a minimal typhoon.

July 9

- 06:00 UTC — Nangka intensifies into a super typhoon.
- 18:00 UTC — Chan-hom intensifies into a Category 4 typhoon.
- 18:00 UTC — Chan-hom exits the PAR and PAGASA issues their final warning on the typhoon.

July 10

- 06:00 UTC — Tropical Depression Linfa fully dissipates over land.

July 12

- 21:00 UTC — Tropical Storm Halola crosses the International Date Line (180°), leaving the area monitored by the Central Pacific Hurricane Center and entering the western Pacific basin.

July 13

- 00:00 UTC — The JMA issues its final advisory on Chan-hom as it became extratropical.
- 00:00 UTC — The JMA starts issuing advisories on Halola, as it had been upgraded to a severe tropical storm.

July 14

- 00:00 UTC — Halola intensifies into a typhoon.
- 00:00 UTC — The JMA starts to monitor a weak tropical depression several miles east-southeast of Taiwan.
- 12:00 UTC — The tropical depression however dissipates as it was getting absorbed by the outflow of Nangka.

July 15

- 12:00 UTC — However the tropical depression regenerates into a depression by the JMA as it several nautical miles north of Palau

July 16

- 06:00 UTC — Halola weakens to a severe tropical storm because of its small size.
- 14:00 UTC — Nangka makes landfall over on the Japanese island of Shikoku.

July 17

- 18:00 UTC — The JMA issues its final warning on Nangka as it was downgraded to a tropical depression.

July 20

- 06:00 UTC — The JMA monitors a tropical depression of the coast of southern China.
- 18:00 UTC — However the same depression over China was absorbed by a trough.

July 23

- 00:00 UTC — Another tropical depression forms east of Luzon, Philippines.
- 09:00 UTC — The JTWC upgrades the depression to Tropical Depression 12W.
- 09:00 UTC — Typhoon Halola enters the PAR, with PAGASA giving the name Goring.
- 18:00 UTC — The JTWC upgrades 12W to a tropical storm, however the JMA still hasn't started initiating advisories on it.

July 25

- 00:00 UTC — The JTWC downgrades 12W to a tropical depression.
- 18:00 UTC — 12W dissipates as it was absorbed by the outflow of Typhoon Halola.

July 26

- 12:00 UTC — Both the JMA and the JTWC issues their final advisory on Halola as it weakens to a tropical depression.

July 29

- 18:00 UTC — The JMA starts to issue advisories on a tropical depression over the eastern Caroline Islands.

July 30

- 09:00 UTC — The tropical depression was given the designation 13W by the JTWC.
- 12:00 UTC — 13W intensifies into Tropical Storm Soudelor.

=== August ===
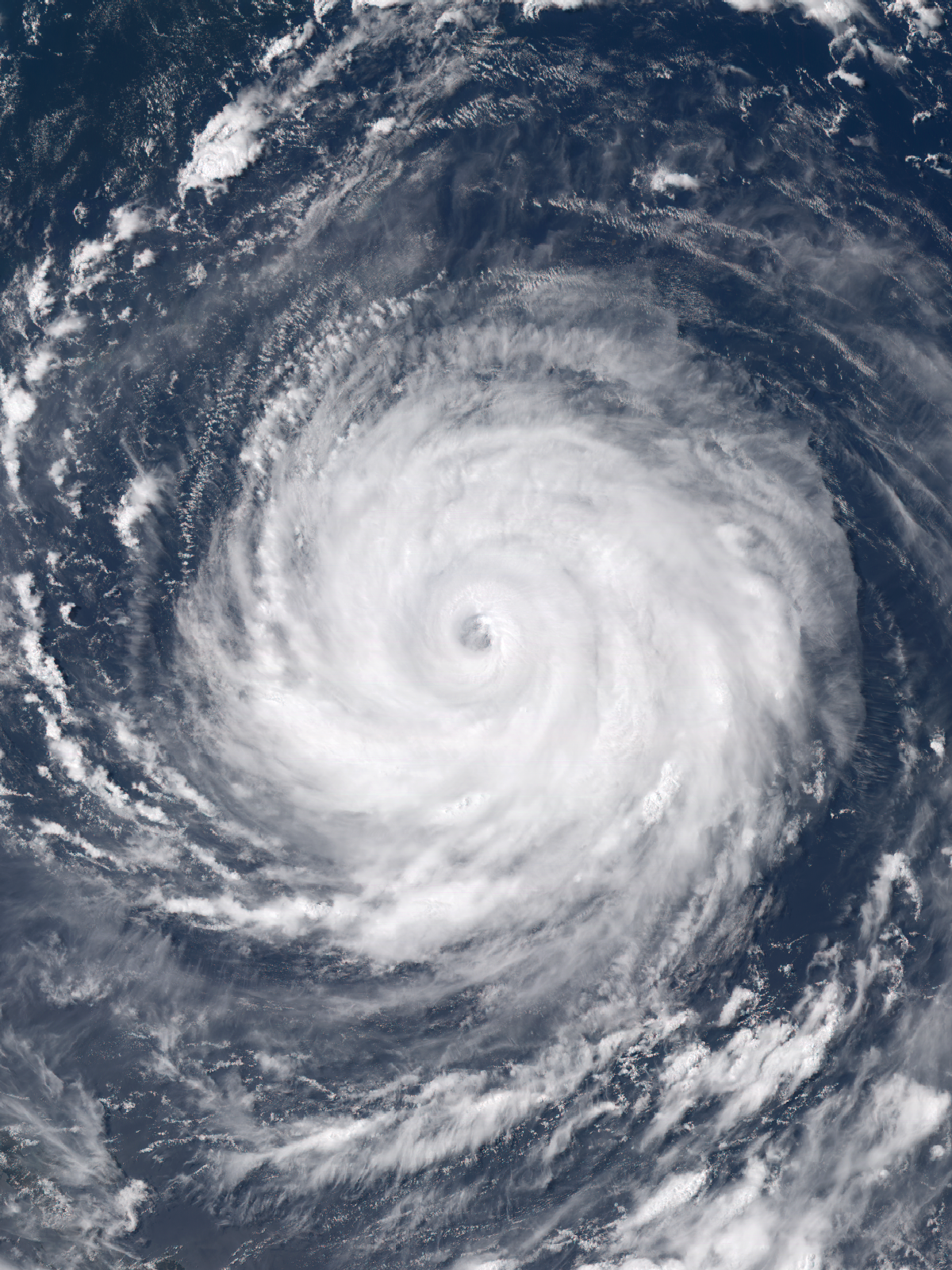
Typhoon Soudelor weakening with an eyewall replacement cycle on August 6

August 1

- 06:00 UTC – The JMA starts to monitor a very weak tropical depression several kilometers southeast of Japan.

August 2

- 06:00 UTC – Both agencies upgrade Soudelor to a typhoon.
- 09:00 UTC – The JTWC starts issuing advisories on the tropical depression, designating it as 14W.

August 3

- 12:00 UTC – The JTWC upgrades Soudelor to super typhoon status.
- 18:00 UTC – Soudelor reaches Category 5 super typhoon intensity.

August 4

- 18:00 UTC – Soudelor weakens to a Category 4 super typhoon.

August 5

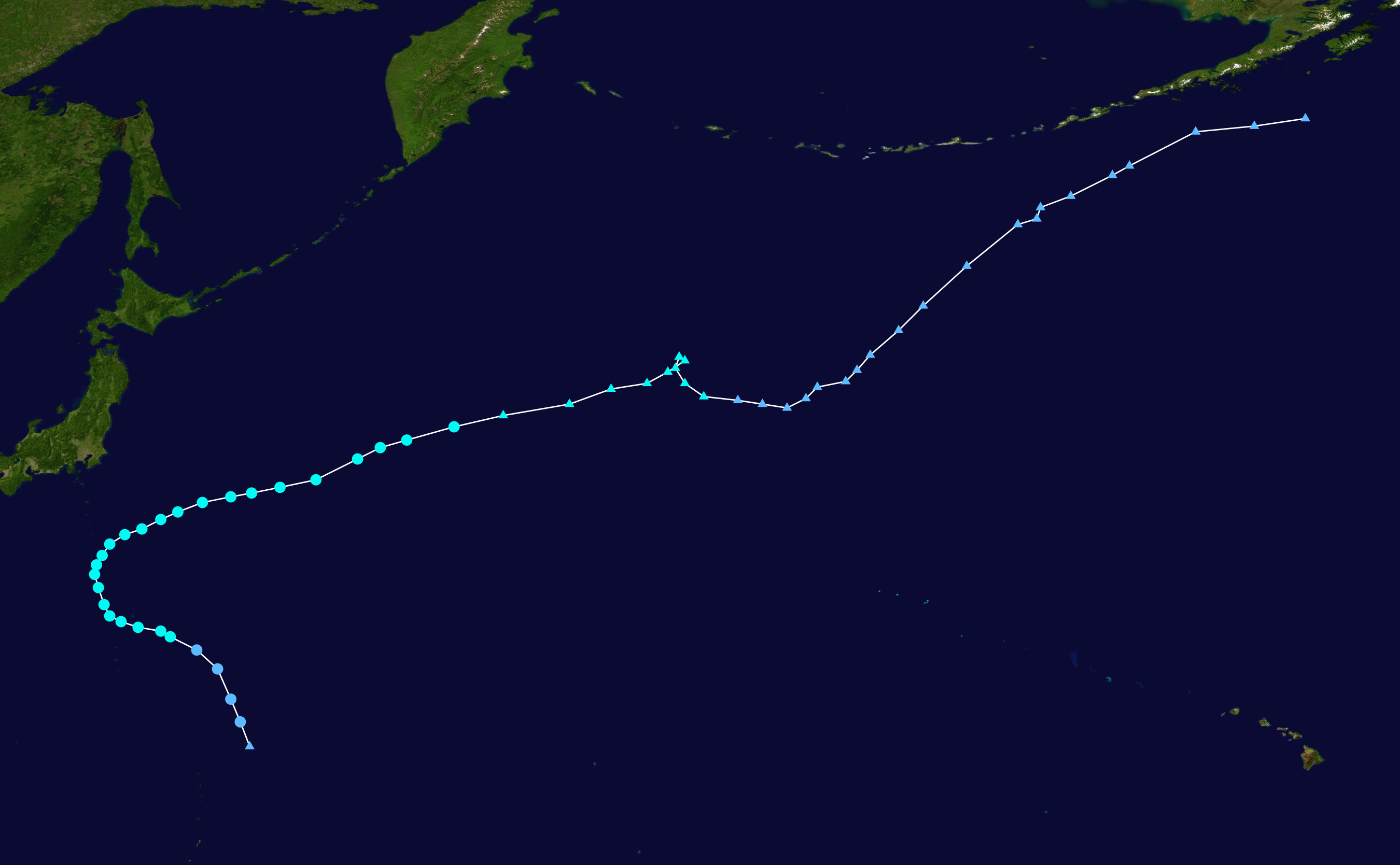
Track of Tropical Storm Molave during early-August

- 00:00 UTC – PAGASA reports that Soudelor had entered their area, receiving the name Hanna.
- 12:00 UTC – A tropical depression develops just east of the Mariana Islands.
- 18:00 UTC – The JMA stops warning on 14W.

August 7

- 03:00 UTC – The JTWC starts issuing advisories on the depression, designating it as 15W.
- 12:00 UTC – 15W intensifies into Tropical Storm Molave.

August 8

- 21:00 UTC – The JTWC issues its final warning on Soudelor.

August 9

- 12:00 UTC – Soudelor weakens to a tropical depression with the JMA issuing its final advisory.
- 15:00 UTC – The JTWC classifies and downgrades Molave to a subtropical depression. Therefore, they issued their final advisory.

August 10

- 03:00 UTC – Because of organization with Molave, the JTWC upgraded Molave to a subtropical storm.

August 11

- 06:00 UTC – The JMA considers that Soudelor had transitioned into an extratropical cyclone.

August 13

- 18:00 UTC – The JMA starts to monitor a tropical depression southeast of Guam.
- 21:00 UTC – The JTWC issues its final warning on Molave.

August 14

- 00:00 UTC – Molave transitions into an extratropical cyclone.
- 03:00 UTC – The depression intensifies into Tropical Depression 16W.
- 06:00 UTC – The JMA starts to monitor another tropical depression east-northeast of 16W.
- 09:00 UTC – The JTWC starts issuing advisories on the depression, designating 17W.
- 18:00 UTC – Both agencies upgrade 16W and 17W to tropical storms, naming them Goni and Atsani.

August 16

- 12:00 UTC – The JMA upgrades Atsani to a typhoon.
- 18:00 UTC – The JMA upgrades Goni to a typhoon.

August 19

- 03:00 UTC – The JTWC classifies Atsani a super typhoon.

=== October ===
October 2

- Tropical Storm Kabayan (Mujigae) made landfall over the Aurora Province

October 3

- Mujigae explosively intensified into a Category 4-equivalent typhoon based on Joint Typhoon Warning Center

October 5

- Mujigae weakens into tropical depression

October 6

- Choi-wan upgraded to the typhoon category

October 7

- Choi-wan started slowly weaken and downgraded to high-end tropical storm intensity

October 8

- Choi-wan reached peak strength with minimum pressure of 955 mb and issued a final warning based on JMA.

October 11

- Area of convection persisted approximately 528 km (328 mi) just north of Pohnpei later that day JMA upgraded the system to a tropical depression

== See also ==
- Timeline of the 2015 Pacific hurricane season
- Timeline of the 2015 Atlantic hurricane season
