= Hurricane Kate (2015) =

Category 1 Atlantic hurricane in 2015

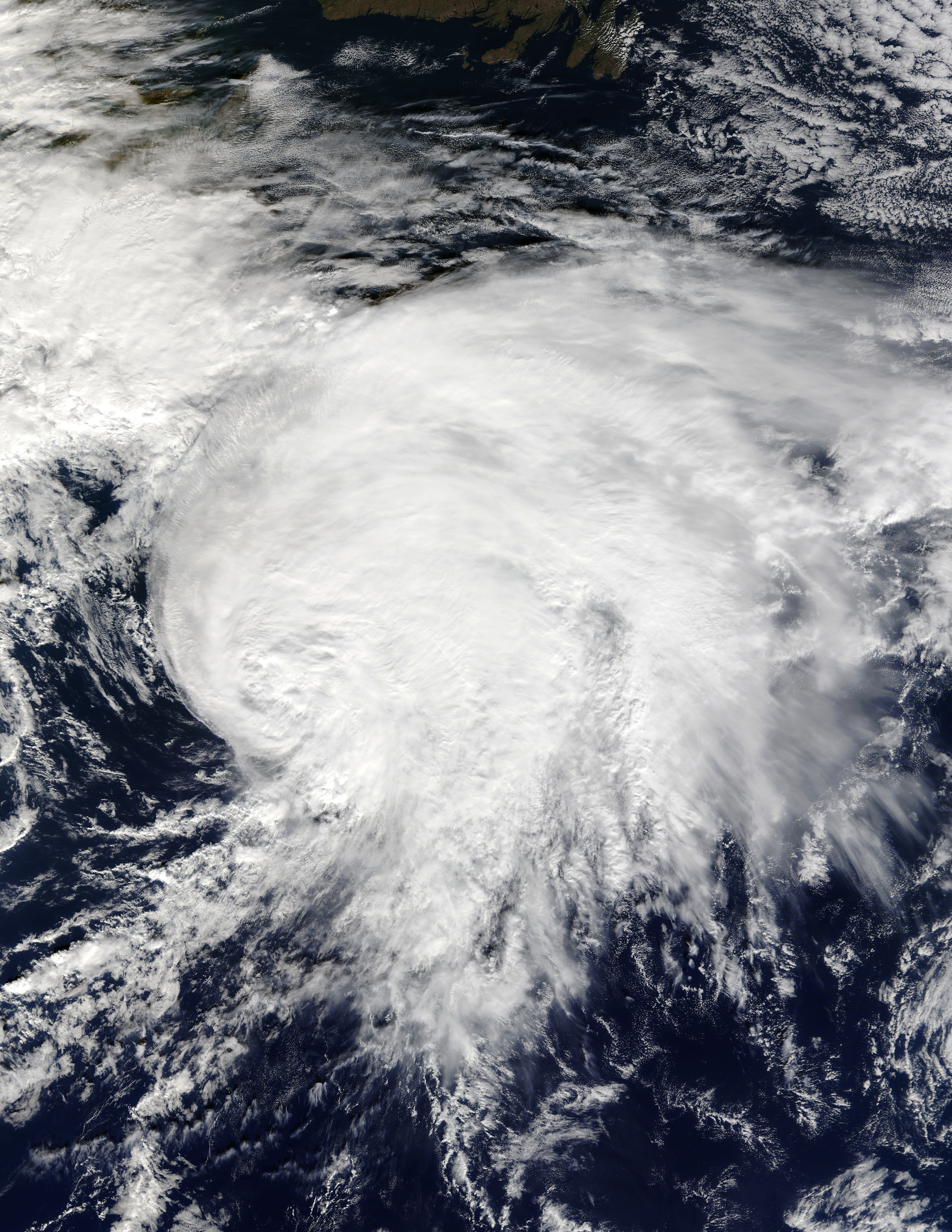
- Hurricane Kate at peak intensity to the northeast of Bermuda on November 11

Meteorological history
- Formed: November 8, 2015
- Extratropical: November 12, 2015
- Dissipated: November 13, 2015

Category 1 hurricane
- 1-minute sustained (SSHWS/NWS)
- Highest winds: 85 mph (140 km/h)
- Lowest pressure: 980 mbar (hPa); 28.94 inHg

Overall effects
- Fatalities: None
- Damage: Minimal
- Areas affected: Lesser Antilles (Martinique), Puerto Rico, Hispaniola, The Bahamas, Europe
- IBTrACS
- Part of the 2015 Atlantic hurricane season

Hurricane Kate was the latest hurricane to form in the Atlantic basin since Epsilon in 2005, as well as one of the northernmost November hurricanes on record. The eleventh and final named storm and fourth hurricane of the 2015 Atlantic hurricane season, Kate formed out of a disorganized tropical wave that had moved off the coast of Africa on October 30. Unfavorable conditions prevented it from significantly organizing as it traversed the Atlantic. Once it neared the northern coast of Hispaniola on November 7, it began to become somewhat better organized. The next day it developed into a tropical depression; shortly afterwards it developed into Tropical Storm Kate. Kate moved northwest around an area of high pressure, gradually strengthening. On November 11, it intensified into a hurricane while simultaneously peaking in intensity. Shortly afterwards, it transitioned into an extratropical cyclone.

Kate caused minor impacts in the Bahamas, other than gusty winds and some rain showers as it passed just to the east on November 9. It also caused minor surf along the East Coast of the United States.

== Meteorological history ==
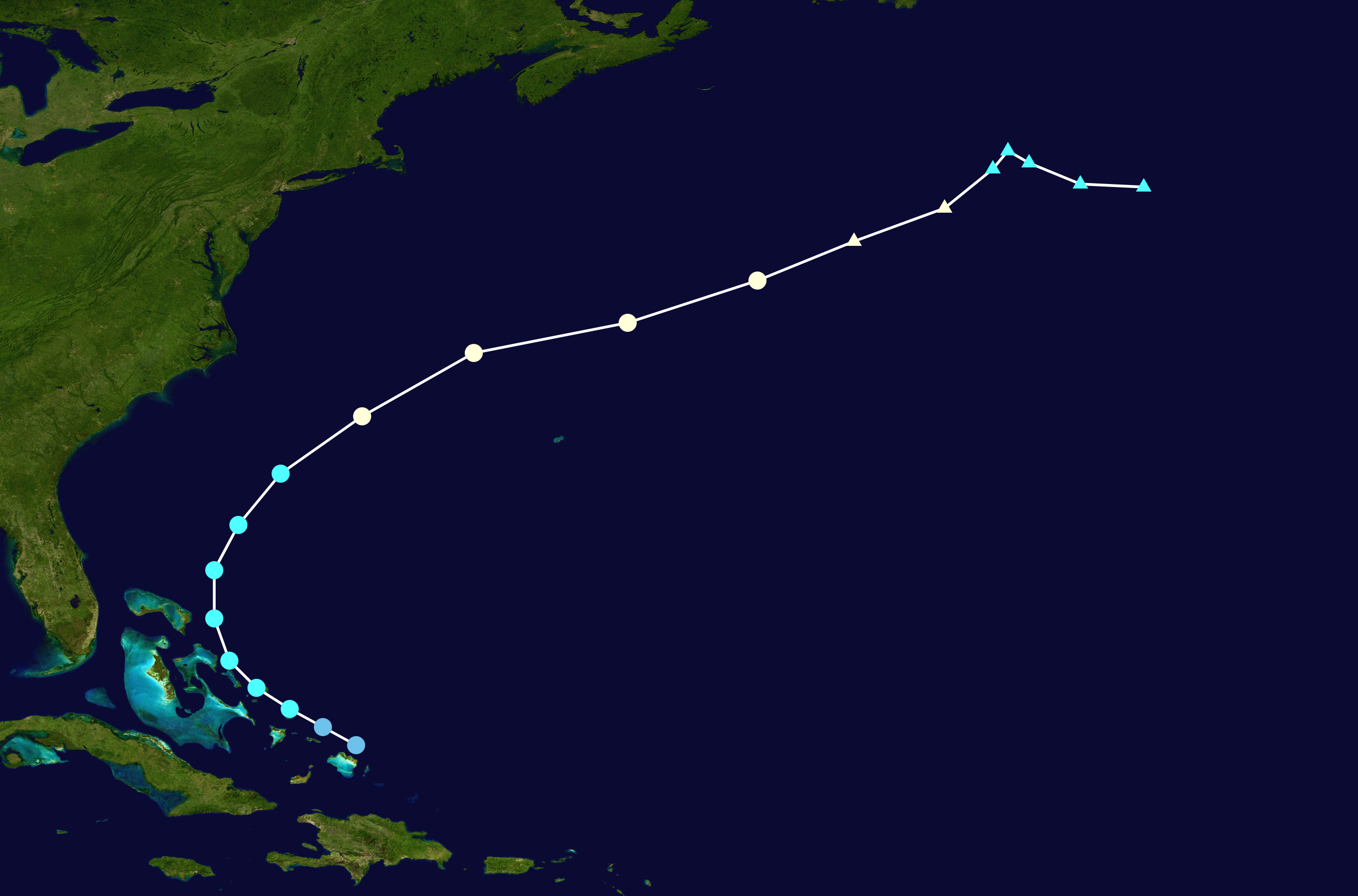
Map plotting the storm's track and intensity, according to the Saffir–Simpson scale Map key Saffir–Simpson scale Tropical depression (≤38 mph, ≤62 km/h) Tropical storm (39–73 mph, 63–118 km/h) Category 1 (74–95 mph, 119–153 km/h) Category 2 (96–110 mph, 154–177 km/h) Category 3 (111–129 mph, 178–208 km/h) Category 4 (130–156 mph, 209–251 km/h) Category 5 (≥157 mph, ≥252 km/h) Unknown Storm type Tropical cyclone Subtropical cyclone Extratropical cyclone, remnant low, tropical disturbance, or monsoon depression

On October 30, a poorly defined tropical wave moved off the coast of Africa with little thunderstorm activity. Passing through the eastern Atlantic in unfavourable conditions, the disorganized continued to the west. As the wave approached the Lesser Antilles, a low-level vorticity split from the wave and traveled to the west-northwest, while the tropical wave headed towards Central America. The new disturbance then turned towards Hispaniola and Puerto Rico, at which point the National Hurricane Center began to monitor the disturbance for possible tropical cyclogenesis. On November 7, convection increased as it passed to the northeast of Hispaniola. By early on November 8, showers and convection became more concentrated around the area of low pressure. Later that day, Tropical Depression Twelve formed north of the Turks and Caicos Islands. The depression moved to the west in response to an area of high pressure that was situated to its north. Banding features began to develop along with a defined outflow pattern, and after an Air Force reconnaissance aircraft investigated the system on November 9, the depression was upgraded to Tropical Storm Kate at 15:00 UTC that day.

The overall size of Kate was initially relatively small, with a compact central dense overcast (CDO) extending only 40 miles (64 km) from the center of the storm. Kate continued to move to the west-northwest while steadily strengthening, and later made its closest approach to The Bahamas on November 9 – passing about 15 miles (24 km) from Cat Island. By the early morning hours of November 10, Kate began to turn to the north in response to a trough that was coming off the East Coast of the United States. By 00:00 UTC on November 11, Kate had intensified into a hurricane as it began to accelerate northeast into and become embedded into the mid-latitude westerlies, after a microwave pass revealed banding features had become more defined near the center. This made it the latest-forming hurricane in the Atlantic basin since Hurricane Epsilon in 2005. Shortly afterwards, Kate reached its peak intensity with winds of 85 mph (140 km/h) and a pressure of a 980 millibars (29 inHg) based on continued improvement of its satellite presentation. Afterwards, colder waters and increasing wind shear caused Kate to weaken, and it transitioned into an extratropical cyclone by 00:00 UTC on November 12. The remnants of Kate continued to accelerate over the North Atlantic Ocean for another day before slowing down dramatically and turning eastwards before being absorbed by a larger cyclone on November 13.

== Preparations and impact ==
The precursor to Kate dropped heavy rainfall on Martinique, reaching 192 millimetres (7.6 in), which caused flash flooding.

Still recovering from the destruction of Hurricane Joaquin nearly a month prior, the Bahamas opened shelters. On November 9, the Bahamas issued a tropical storm warning for the northern portions of the country. The National Emergency Management Agency (NEMA) issued a Level II Activation code. In northern Eleuthera, the Glass Window Bridge was shut down in advance of tropical storm conditions. Bahamasair delayed a flight due to the storm. Public schools in Cat Island and San Salvador were closed.

Only high surf and some outer bands from Kate impacted Bermuda as it accelerated to the north.

The remnants of Kate brought heavy rainfall to Ireland reaching 80 millimetres (3.1 in). The rains triggered flash floods and evacuations. In County Donegal, a bridge vanished due to the rising tides. The River Deel, overflowed and flooded into the city of Crossmolina. Several roads were closed, and cars were destroyed. In the United Kingdom, some damage was reported. In Wales, high winds from the system knocked down numerous trees, and heavy rain caused flash flooding, which covered roadways.

== See also ==
- Timeline of the 2015 Atlantic hurricane season
