= Hurricane Danny (2015) =

Category 3 Atlantic hurricane in 2015

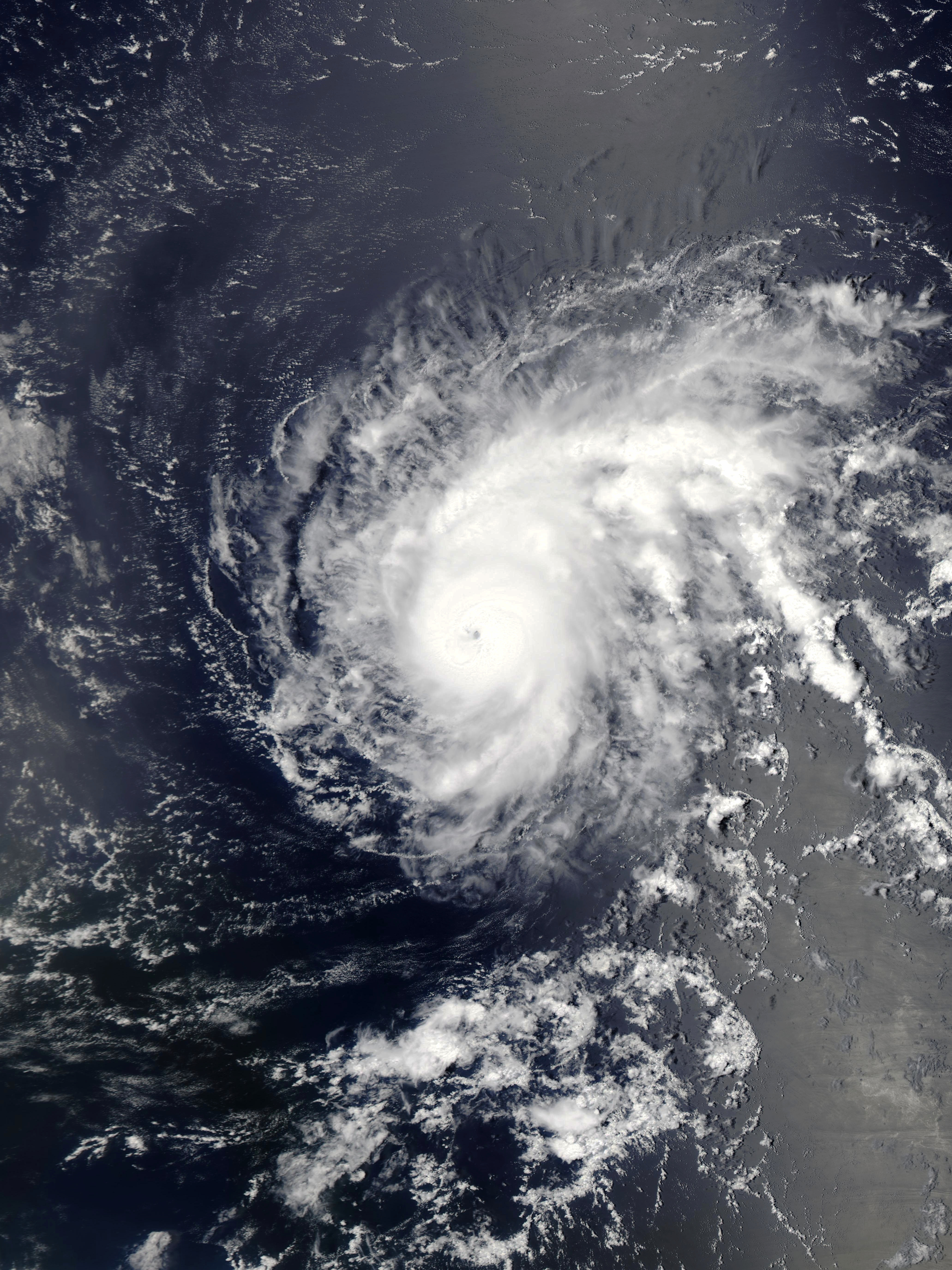
- Danny shortly after its peak intensity on August 21

Meteorological history
- Formed: August 18, 2015
- Dissipated: August 24, 2015

Category 3 major hurricane
- 1-minute sustained (SSHWS/NWS)
- Highest winds: 125 mph (205 km/h)
- Lowest pressure: 960 mbar (hPa); 28.35 inHg

Overall effects
- Fatalities: None
- Damage: Minimal
- Areas affected: Lesser Antilles, Puerto Rico
- IBTrACS
- Part of the 2015 Atlantic hurricane season

Hurricane Danny was the first major hurricane to develop between the Lesser Antilles and Western Africa since Hurricane Julia in 2010. The fourth tropical cyclone, and first hurricane of the 2015 Atlantic hurricane season, Danny originated from a well-defined tropical wave that emerged over the Atlantic Ocean on August 14. Traveling west, the system gradually coalesced into a tropical depression by August 18. After becoming a tropical storm later that day, dry air slowed further development. On August 20–21, dry air became removed from the system, and Danny rapidly intensified into a Category 3 hurricane on the Saffir–Simpson hurricane wind scale. Its peak was short-lived as wind shear soon increased and prompted significant weakening. Degrading to a tropical storm by August 23, Danny approached the Lesser Antilles. It degenerated into a tropical wave as it traversed the archipelago on August 24 and was last noted over Hispaniola the following day.

The hurricane prompted the issuance of several tropical storm warnings for the Lesser Antilles. Leeward Islands Air Transport cancelled 40 flights and sandbags were distributed in the United States Virgin Islands. Danny ultimately only brought light rain to the region, with its effects considered beneficial due to a severe drought.

== Meteorological history ==
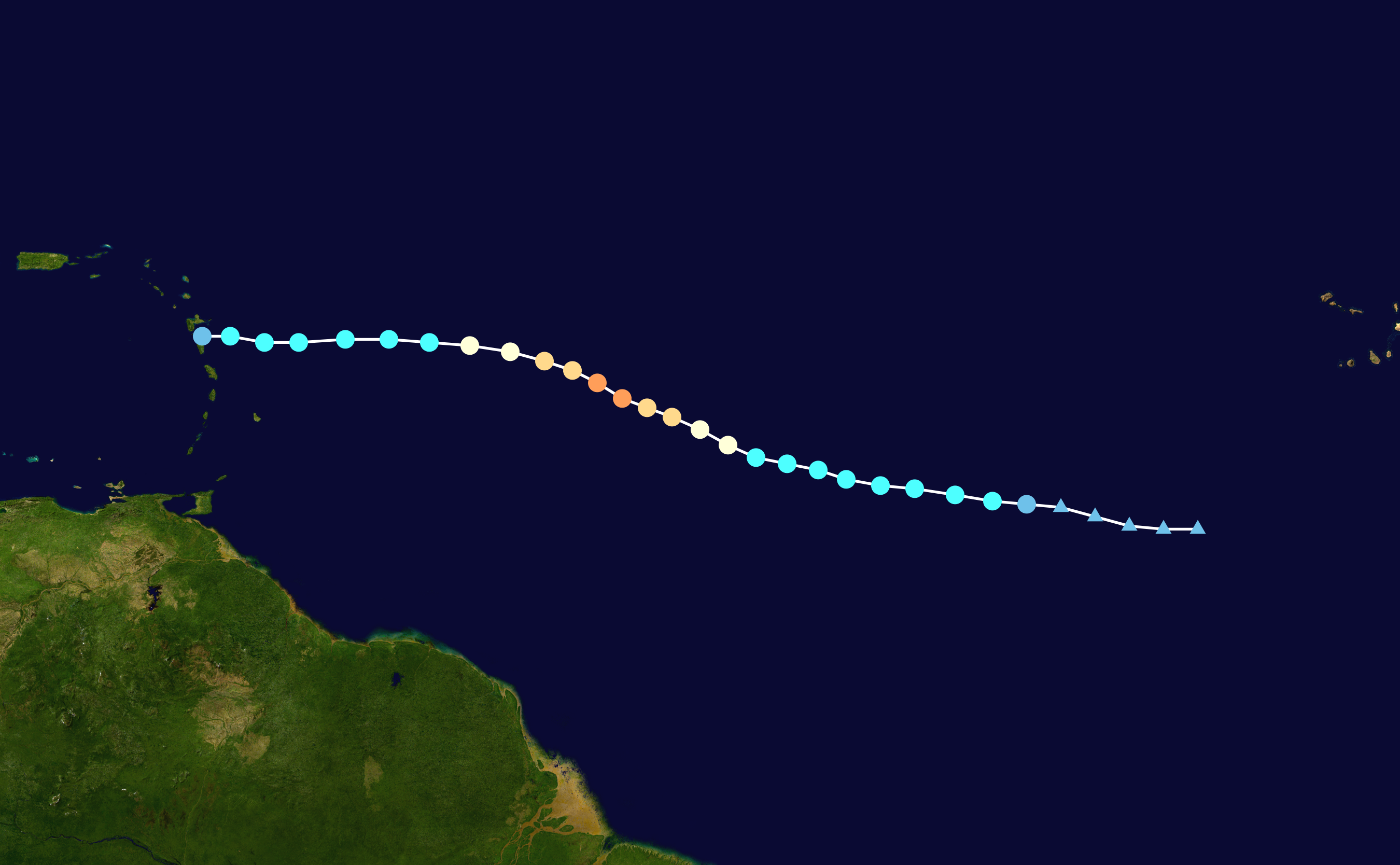
Map plotting the storm's track and intensity, according to the Saffir–Simpson scale Map key Saffir–Simpson scale Tropical depression (≤38 mph, ≤62 km/h) Tropical storm (39–73 mph, 63–118 km/h) Category 1 (74–95 mph, 119–153 km/h) Category 2 (96–110 mph, 154–177 km/h) Category 3 (111–129 mph, 178–208 km/h) Category 4 (130–156 mph, 209–251 km/h) Category 5 (≥157 mph, ≥252 km/h) Unknown Storm type Tropical cyclone Subtropical cyclone Extratropical cyclone, remnant low, tropical disturbance, or monsoon depression

On August 14, 2015, a well-defined tropical wave, accompanied by significant surface pressure falls, traversed Western Africa and emerged over the Atlantic Ocean that evening. A broad surface low developed along the wave on August 15. Embedded within monsoon flow, various environmental factors enabled gradual development of the disturbance, including low wind shear, above-average sea surface temperatures, moderate moisture content, and favorable diffluence. A subtropical ridge to the north steered the system generally west-northwest throughout its entire existence. On August 17, the surface low became increasingly defined and convection more persistent. It subsequently acquired enough organization to be classified a tropical depression at 06:00 UTC on August 18. At this time, it was situated about 825 mi (1,325 km) west-southwest of Praia, Cape Verde.

The depression traversed a region generally favoring further development; however, occasional intrusions of dry air from the Saharan Air Layer initially inhibited rapid growth. The system reached tropical storm-status by 12:00 UTC on August 18—based on satellite intensity estimates using the Dvorak Technique—and it was assigned the name Danny accordingly. Banding features developed around the circulation early on August 19. A temporary intrusion of dry air caused convection to collapse later that day, but cloud cover redeveloped within hours. Improving upper-level outflow supported the formation of a central dense overcast and a 12 mi (19 km) wide-eye soon developed. Danny reached hurricane-strength by 12:00 UTC on August 20, by which time it was located 1,095 mi (1,760 km) east of the Windward Islands. A trough over the mid-Atlantic weakened the subtropical ridge and caused the hurricane to move at a relatively slow pace of 10 mph (16 km/h).

An unusually small hurricane, with gale-force winds extending only 60 mi (95 km) from its center, Danny was prone to significant fluctuations in intensity, making forecasts particularly difficult. Indeed, the storm soon underwent an unpredicted period of rapid intensification aided by nearly non-existent upper-level wind shear. Low-level moisture wrapped around the circulation during this phase, mitigating the influence of the Saharan air layer. Danny achieved its peak intensity around 12:00 UTC on August 21 as a Category 3 hurricane on the Saffir–Simpson hurricane wind scale; maximum sustained winds were estimated at 125 mph (205 km/h) alongside a barometric pressure of 960 mbar (hPa; 28.35 inHg). (Note: The peak intensity of Danny was extrapolated from a NOAA Hurricane Hunter mission into the storm around 16:00–17:00 UTC on August 21, during which the aircraft's stepped-frequency microwave radiometer (SFMR) observed surface winds of 120 mph (195 km/h). By the time the aircraft reached the storm, its satellite appearance had begun degrading and Danny's intensity is assumed to have been slightly higher than observed.) Shortly thereafter, increasing shear and dry air initiated a rapid weakening phase. The storm's eye became obscured by clouds and disappeared from satellite image late on August 21.

Throughout August 22, Danny's structure deteriorated with its surface and mid-level circulations becoming tilted with height due to the shear. The surface low soon became exposed with convection displaced to the northeast, and Danny weakened to a tropical storm by 00:00 UTC on August 23. The storm briefly leveled off in intensity somewhat later that day, with its circulation back under convection; intense lightning was observed near the cyclone's center. Late on August 23, Danny's structure began degrading once more with its circulation becoming significantly displaced from the remaining ragged convection. Early on August 24, hurricane hunters struggled to find a circulation center as Danny neared the Lesser Antilles, and the system weakened to a tropical depression by 12:00 UTC as it passed between Guadeloupe and Dominica. Hours later it degenerated into a tropical wave, marking its dissipation as a tropical cyclone. The remnants of Danny continued to the west-northwest for another day and were last noted over Hispaniola.

== Preparations and impact ==
On August 22, governments across the Lesser Antilles issued tropical storm watches. The islands of Antigua, Anguilla, Barbuda, Montserrat, Nevis, Saba, St. Eustatius, and St. Kitts were placed under a tropical storm warning the following day. These advisories were discontinued following Danny's degradation to a tropical depression on August 24. Leeward Islands Air Transport cancelled 40 flights across the eastern Caribbean due to the hurricane and cruise ships altered their courses. Although members of the Haiti Office of Civil Protection issued an official statement to residents saying Danny was not a threat to the country, they convened to discuss potential preparations and the status of emergency supplies. Officials in the United States Virgin Islands distributed sandbags and opened shelters. Météo-France issued an "orange" alert for Guadeloupe Saint Barthélemy, and Saint Martin, advising residents about heavy rain and strong winds. Officials in Guadeloupe shut down several roads a precautionary measure. The expected rainfall was welcomed across the entire affected region, which was suffering from a severe drought.

About 2 in (51 mm) of rain fell in Dominica, leading to minor rockslides, and 1.5 in (38 mm) was observed in Antigua. Some disruption to electrical and water supplies occurred on Guadeloupe. Rainfall was less than expected across Puerto Rico, with most areas receiving less than 1 in (25 mm); a peak value of 2.01 in (51 mm) was observed in Naguabo. The Carraízo Dam, then at a critically low 110.7 ft (33.74 m), received 1.5 in (38 mm). Though relatively light, the accumulations increased the water level by 12 in (30 cm). Similarly, water levels at the Fajardo Dam rose by 9.8 in (25 cm).

Just a few days after Danny, Tropical Storm Erika brought devastating floods to Dominica, killing 30 people and wrecking tremendous damage. Other Caribbean islands received additional rainfall from the storm.

== See also ==
- Other storms of the same name
- Timeline of the 2015 Atlantic hurricane season
- List of Category 3 Atlantic hurricanes
- Tropical Storm Erika – Affected similar areas shortly after Danny did, causing catastrophic flooding in Dominica
- Hurricane Beryl (2018) – Another small, rapidly-developing tropical cyclone.
