= Hope Great House (The Bahamas) =

National park in The Bahamas

- Location within Bahamas
- Location: Crooked Island, the Bahamas
- Coordinates: 22.7926°N 74.3340°W
- Area: 3.6 acres (1 ha)
- Established: 2002
- Governing body: Bahamas National Trust
- Website: bnt.bs/hope-great-house/

Hope Great House is a national park on Crooked Island, the Bahamas. The park was established in 2002 and has an area of 3.6 acres (1 ha). The park is the site of a former plantation house.
