= Tropical Storm Nock-ten =

Pacific severe tropical storm in 2011

Severe Tropical Storm Nock-ten (Juaning)
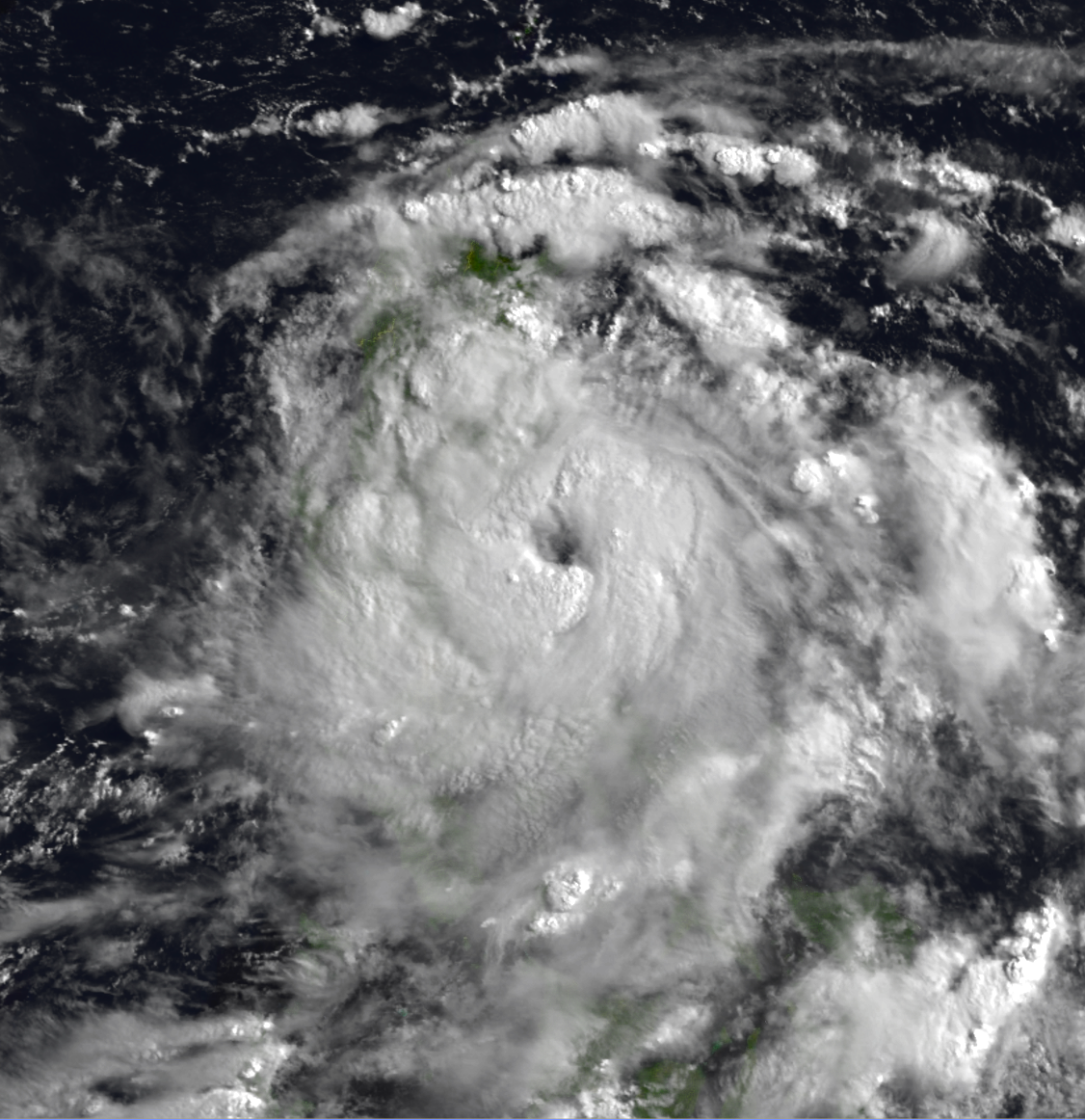
- Tropical Storm Nock-ten making landfall in the Philippines at peak intensity late on July 26

Meteorological history
- Formed: July 24, 2011
- Dissipated: July 31, 2011

Severe tropical storm
- 10-minute sustained (JMA)
- Highest winds: 95 km/h (60 mph)
- Lowest pressure: 985 hPa (mbar); 29.09 inHg

Category 1-equivalent typhoon
- 1-minute sustained (SSHWS/JTWC)
- Highest winds: 120 km/h (75 mph)
- Lowest pressure: 974 hPa (mbar); 28.76 inHg

Overall effects
- Fatalities: 128
- Missing: 10
- Damage: $126 million (2011 USD)
- Areas affected: Philippines, South Central China, Vietnam, Laos, Thailand
- IBTrACS
- Part of the 2011 Pacific typhoon season

Severe Tropical Storm Nock-ten, (Note: The name Nock-ten (Lao: ນົກເຕັນ, [nok̚˧ ten˩]) was contributed by Laos and means kingfisher in Lao.) known in the Philippines as Typhoon Juaning, was a strong tropical storm which made a total of four landfalls in Southeast Asia in late-July 2011, killing more than 100 people and causing damage estimated at US$126 million. It was the eighth named storm and the fourth severe tropical storm of the 2011 Pacific typhoon season.

The depression formed on July 24. Though it was one of the deadliest tropical storms of 2011, its anticipated landfall was well-publicized and appropriate preparations were made. (cf.:Conson) Its peak intensity was measured at 65 knots (120 km/h; 75 mph) on the SSHS east of the Philippines. At initial landfall, the storm killed 75, leaving 9 missing, and causing damage around US$65.73 million. The storm exited land and started strengthening again as it moved into the South China Sea. The system turned towards China's Island province of Hainan where a yellow alert was issued and heavy to very heavy rainfall was predicted. Fourteen flights from Hainan's provincial capital Haikou were cancelled and rail ferry service to China was suspended. Some 27,700 people were evacuated from Hainan's low-lying area. Nock-ten claimed 2 lives and caused widespread damage worth US$58 million in Hainan. The system again exited land and strengthened as it curved towards Vietnam. On approaching land, the system and its remnants affected Laos and Thailand. The storm poured extremely heavy rainfall flooding the Yom River and the Nan River. 650,000 people were evacuated from low-lying areas as some 6,200 acres of rice and other crop fields were reported completely submerged. Damages were expected to be US$2.33 million and the death toll was put at 42.

== Meteorological history ==
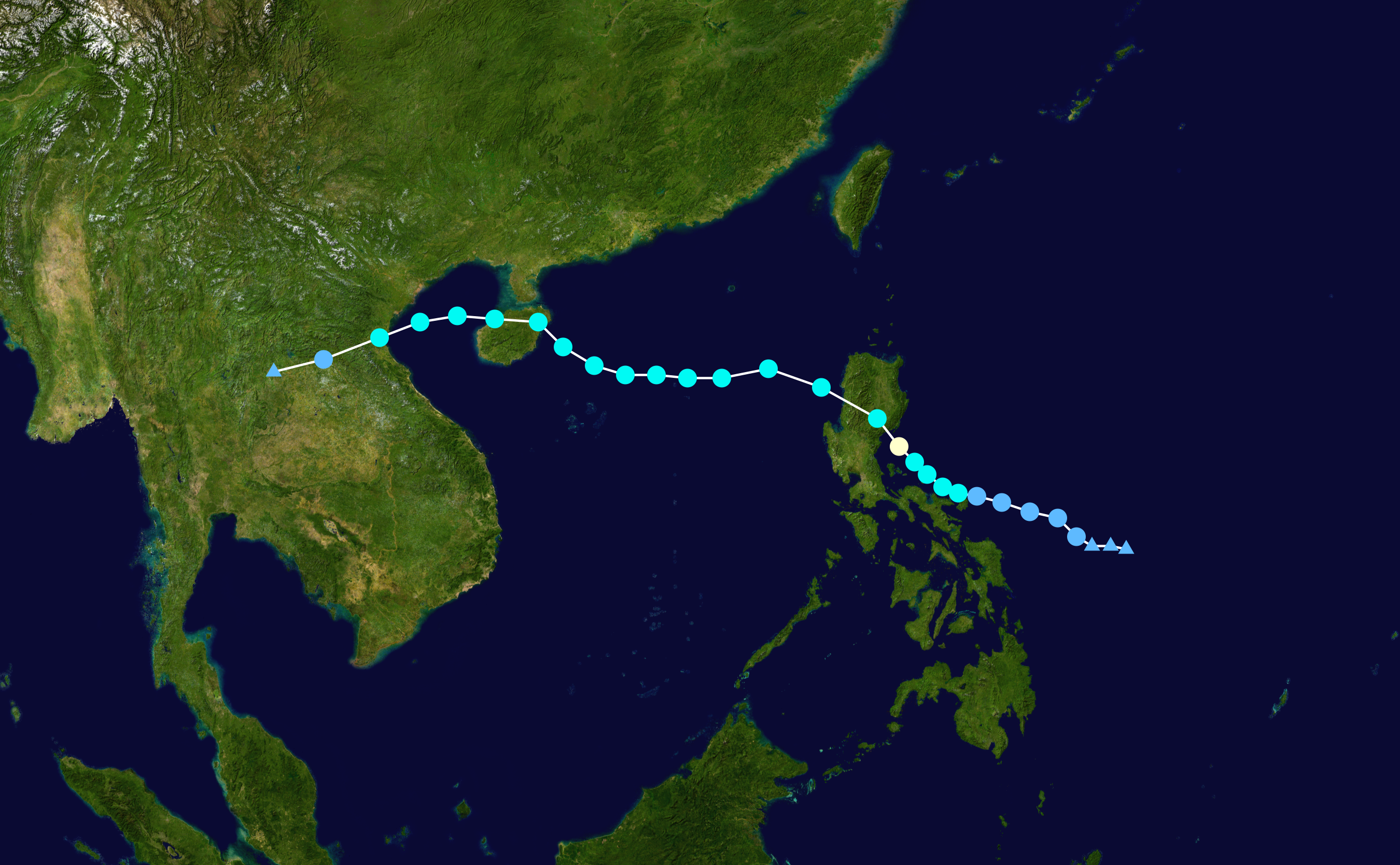
Map plotting the storm's track and intensity, according to the Saffir–Simpson scale Map key Saffir–Simpson scale Tropical depression (≤38 mph, ≤62 km/h) Tropical storm (39–73 mph, 63–118 km/h) Category 1 (74–95 mph, 119–153 km/h) Category 2 (96–110 mph, 154–177 km/h) Category 3 (111–129 mph, 178–208 km/h) Category 4 (130–156 mph, 209–251 km/h) Category 5 (≥157 mph, ≥252 km/h) Unknown Storm type Tropical cyclone Subtropical cyclone Extratropical cyclone, remnant low, tropical disturbance, or monsoon depression

Early on July 22, an area of low pressure formed to the east of the Philippines. The system gradually drifted west over the next few days and late on July 24, the Joint Typhoon Warning Center started monitoring the system as a Tropical Depression. Early the next day, the Japan Meteorological Agency (JMA) upgraded the area of low pressure into a Tropical Depression. A few hours later, the Philippine Atmospheric, Geophysical and Astronomical Services Administration (PAGASA) started monitoring the system as a Tropical Depression and named it 'Juaning'. The system continued to drift westwards and strengthened rapidly. On midnight that day, the JMA further upgraded the system into a Tropical Storm, naming it Nock-ten.

Early on July 27, JMA reported that Nock-ten continued to strengthen and upgraded it to a Severe Tropical Storm. Nock-ten moved east of the Polillo Islands as it moved towards Aurora. A few hours later, the JTWC reported that Nock-ten rapidly intensified to a category 1 typhoon and made landfall over the town of Casiguran, Aurora while developing an eye feature and started weakening after land interaction with the Sierra Madre mountain range. Nock-ten affected multiple areas in Central Luzon as it traveled through the landmass of Luzon. Later the same day, JMA reported that Nock-ten had exited Luzon island at Candon, Ilocos maintaining severe tropical storm strength. Overnight, the storm weakened and became disorganized as the Japan Meteorological Agency downgraded it to a minor tropical storm the next day. On July 29, the storm gradually regained strength while traveling through the South China Sea and approached the Chinese province Qionghai. Later that day, the storm strengthened over land and headed north towards Hainan's provincial capital region Haikou. The storm weakened rapidly and at midnight that day, the JMA, issuing their final warning, downgraded it to a tropical low over Vietnam.

== Preparations and impact ==
=== Philippines ===
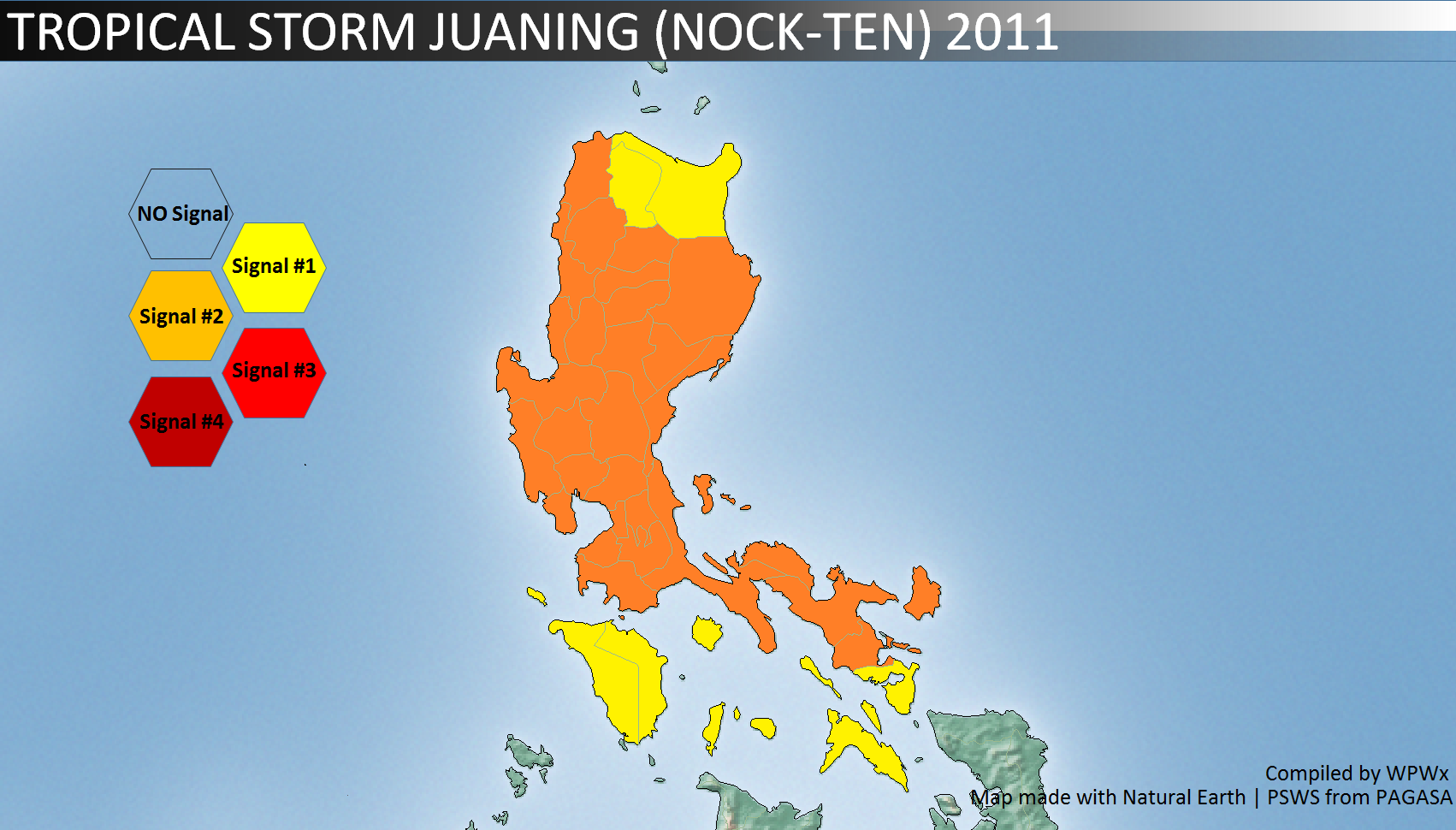
Highest PSWS raised by PAGASA as Juaning traversed Luzon

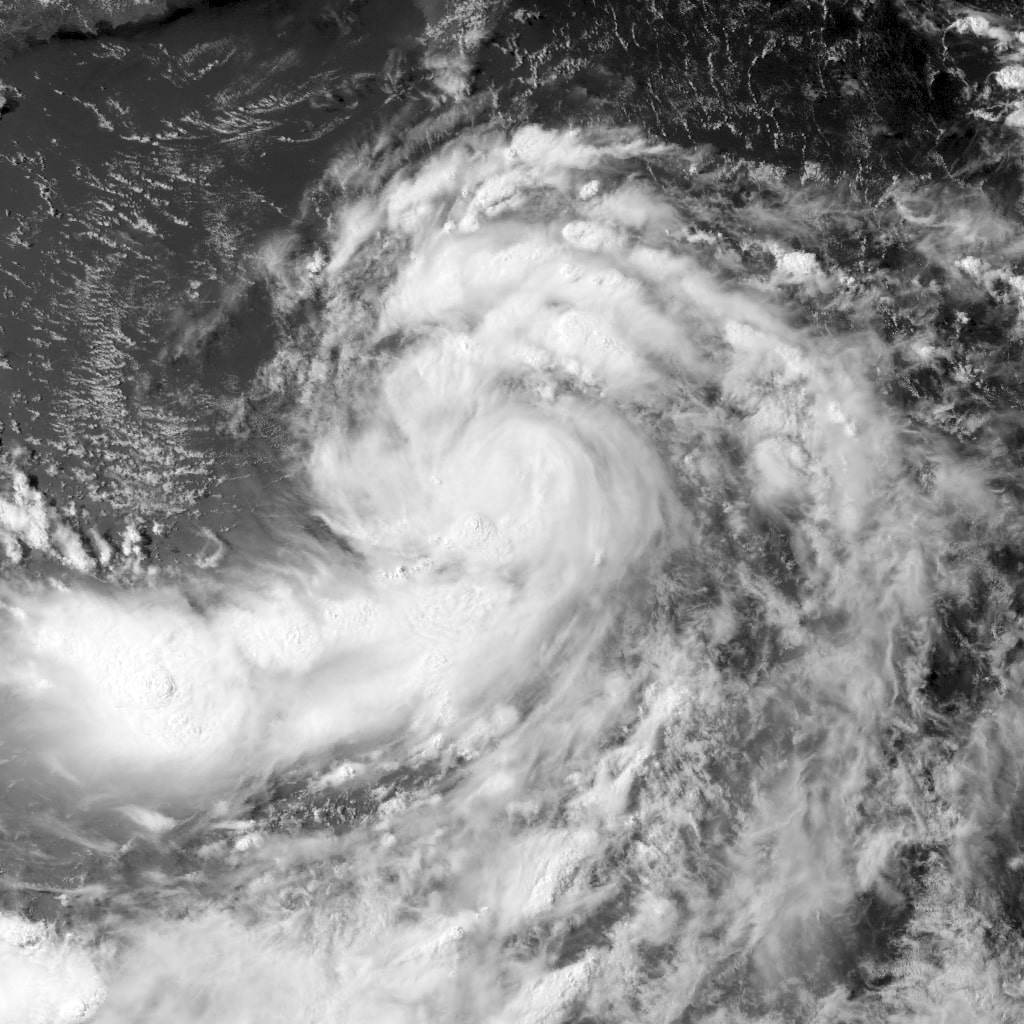
Tropical Storm Nock-ten over the Philippines

The provinces of Albay, Camarines Norte and Camarines Sur were reported to be completely flooded by rain. Minor damage to rice crops was reported. Heavier rains were expected throughout the day as the system moved into the South China Sea and reintensified. The number of missing was raised to 31 after 25 crewmembers of a fishing boat were reported missing when their boat was caught in the storm off Masbate. All classes in Luzon on July 26 and 27 were suspended. In Northern Luzon, Nock-ten's heavy rainfall caused widespread flooding. The national roads were impassable and landslides were reported. About 26 domestic flights were cancelled from July 26 to 27. The death toll was upgraded to 27 and more than 60 people were listed as missing. The National Disaster Risk Reduction and Management Council began rescuing stranded people and searching for lost fishermen. On July 28, the death toll was put at 35 as two government mines bureau staffers and two police officers with them were recovered from flood waters and landslides in Luzon. By that time, the storm displaced a total of 728,554 people from several Philippine provinces in Luzon within the Ilocos Region, Central Luzon and Bicol Region. Later that day, the government accused the Philippine Atmospheric, Geophysical and Astronomical Services Administration (PAGASA) of issuing inaccurate forecasts.

On July 29, the Philippine death toll was raised to 41. The National Disaster Risk Reduction and Management Council (NDRRMC) announced the total damage caused by the storm to Philippines was US$26,896,788. Among the dead was the mother of Joey Salceda, the governor of Albay province. She died on Wednesday of head trauma after slipping on the stairs during a power outage caused by the tropical storm. On July 30, the death toll was again increased to 50. The NDRRMC also upgraded the total damage to infrastructure and agriculture to US$34,809,609. Most of the dead were drowned, hit by fallen tree or electric posts, or were buried in landslides. The majority of those affected were from the worst hit Bicol region. Many communities in the Bicol region were in need of potable water, electricity and work crews to clear debris and mangled up roads. On August 2, NDRRMC again increased the Philippine death toll to 66 and the total damage to infrastructure and agriculture to US$41,811,413. Two days later, a survey by NDCC showed that school buildings were the worst hit. Damage was reported to be a staggering US$13,794,381, and the total damage to Agriculture, Infrastructure and Schools was put at US$65,730,769.69. The number of dead was also upgraded to 69 and the number of missing was downgraded to 14. On August 5, the Philippine death toll was changed to 75 and the number of missing was downgraded to 9. According to NDRRMC, the Philippine government had spent a total of US$650,653 in assisting the victims of the storm.

=== China ===
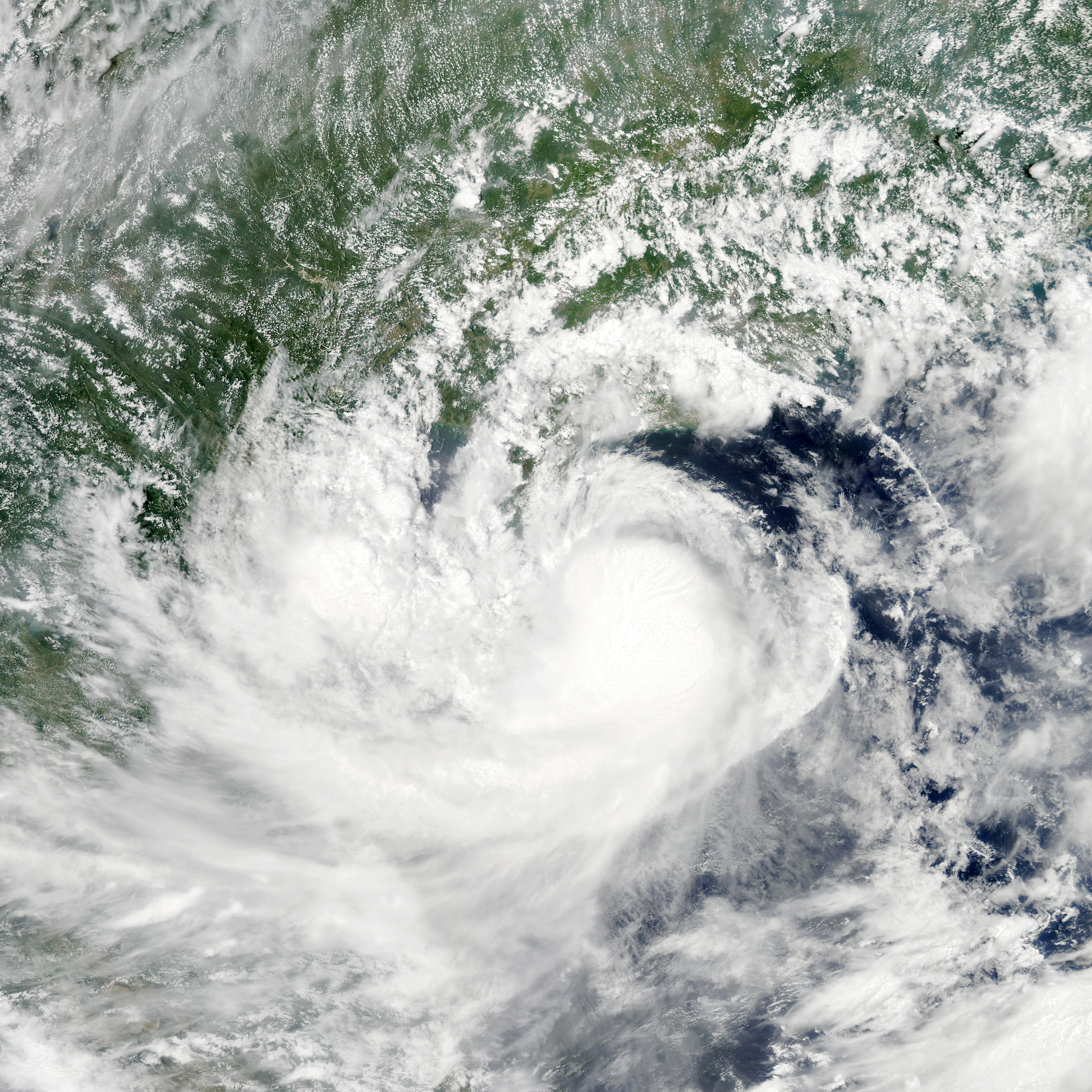
Tropical Storm Nock-ten shortly before landfall in Hainan on July 29

On July 25, Hong Kong issued Signal No. 1 for Hong Kong. On July 28, the residents of western Guangdong started preparing for the storm when China's flood control authority launched an emergency response. The storm was originally expected to brush the South China coast by July 29. However, it gradually slowed down. As the system neared the Chinese coast, China's meteorological authority issued a yellow alert and was predicting heavy to very heavy rainfall in parts of the Sichuan Basin. The provinces of Guangdong, Guangxi and Hainan were alerted. On July 29, some 36,000 sea vessels carrying more than 120,000 crew were warned. With that, some 26,000 fishing boats China's Hainan Province returned to port.

As the storm approached later that day, 14 flights from Hainan's provincial capital Haikou were cancelled. The rail ferry service to Mainland China was suspended. The storm was originally expected to turn west after landfall. However, it headed north and hit Hainan's provincial capital Haikou. As a result, some 27,700 people were evacuated from Hainan's low-lying area and some 2,602 fishing ships returned to port. Heavy rain and strong winds halted all shipping services across the Qiongzhou Strait. Later the next day, China's flood control authorities evacuated 189,033 residents to safe areas. On July 31, China's provincial flood control office reported that, in total, Nock-ten claimed 2 lives and caused widespread damage worth US$58 million in Hainan province.

=== Vietnam, Laos and Thailand ===
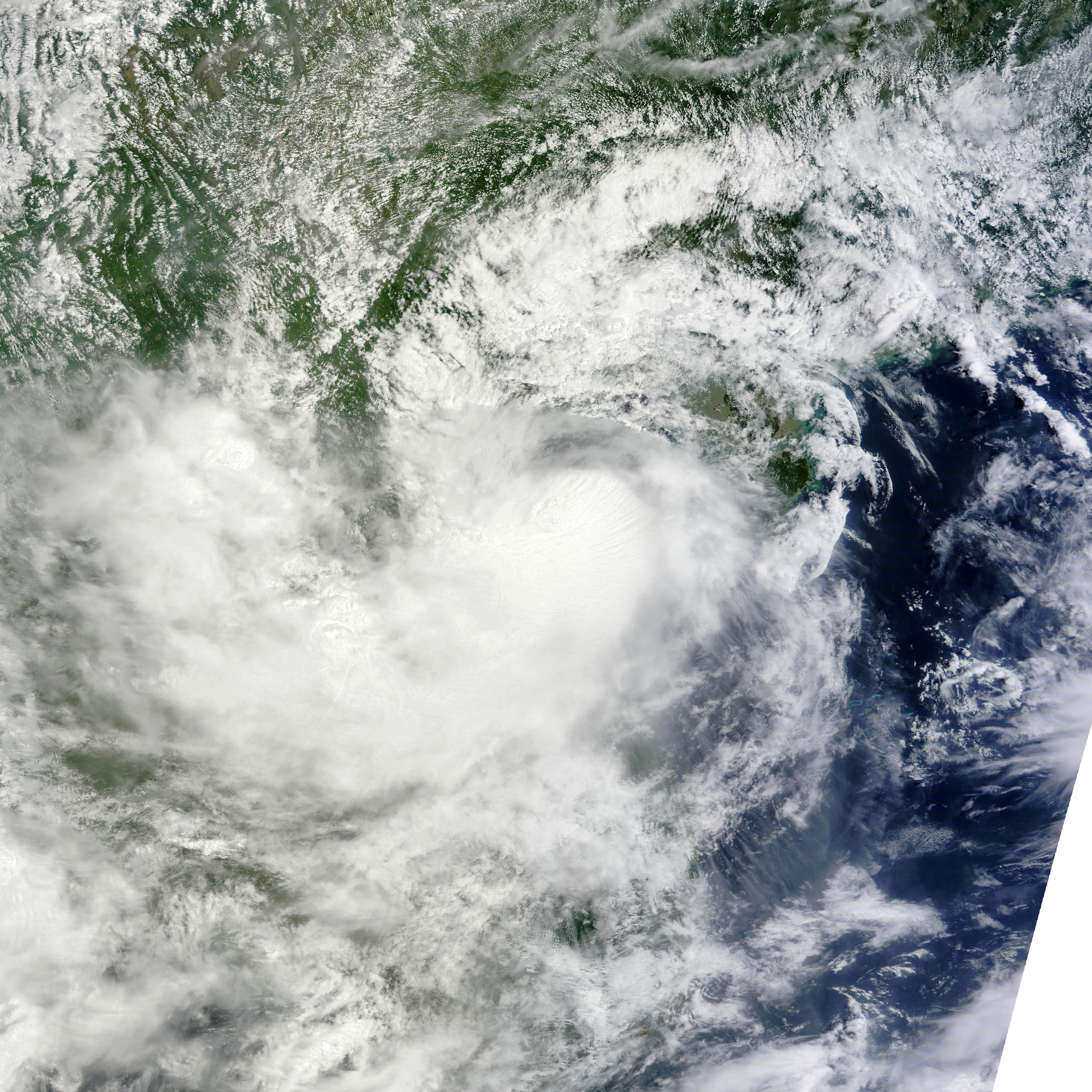
Tropical Storm Nock-ten near landfall in Vietnam on July 30

As the storm neared land, a Vietnamese boat carrying 12 fishermen capsized and drifted towards Palawan, near the Philippines. A few hours later, the fishermen were rescued. The Thai Meteorological Department issued warnings for Phuket and much of Thailand. Strong winds and heavy rain were predicted to affect the Andaman Sea. As a result, the people of Thailand's northern provinces started preparing for floods and strong winds. The Yom River and the Nan River were reported to be almost overflowing, damaging rice paddy fields and farmland. About 650,000 people were evacuated from low-lying areas in the Tonkin Gulf region. On July 30, just before final landfall, the storm started claiming Vietnamese, with one man killed by the waves. As a result, meteorological officials repeated their warning that small boats should not put to sea. Later that day, some 6 flights of Vietnam Airlines were cancelled and many more were delayed because of the storm. Over the next day, after the storm's final landfall, some 6,200 acres of rice and other crop fields were reported to be completely submerged. The storm's consequences were described as "not considerable" as the storm did not cause much damage.

On July 31, the Vietnamese death toll was upgraded to three, as another man was killed by electric shock when lightning stroke the electric pole and a 13-year-old child drowned. The storm damaged at least four fishing vessels, sinking one from Quảng Ngãi Province near the Spratly Islands. The north and northeastern provinces of Thailand were reported to be completely flooded and some townships were said to be under a staggering 80 centimetres (31 in) of water. Two people were reported missing in the flood waters. Flooding occurred in many northern and central provinces. Heavy rainfall inundated low-lying areas of Khammuan and Borikhamxay. 25 villages and 15 schools remained underwater two days later. Thailand tourism was luckily not much affected by the system though most of the places in the North were completely flooded, filling several hotels with water. On August 5, the Thai death toll was put at 7, sending the total death toll of Nock-ten to 31. At least 4 people were reported missing in the storm. Soon afterwards, the death toll was re-upgraded to 13 while the number of missing was downgraded to 1 as more bodies were found. Damages were estimated at US$2.33 million. The Thai death toll reached 20. Some 20 provinces were submerged by the system.

== Aftermath and retirement ==
On August 11, 10 days after the storm dissipated, several regions in Thailand were still underwater. The storm was reported to have affected a total of at least 1,371,137 people and killed 22 throughout the country. Floodwaters were still affecting 411,585 people in the provinces of Phrae, Sukhothai, Uttaradit, Phichit, Phitsanulok, Tak, Nakhon Sawan, Ayutthaya and Mukdahan. Several days later, the death toll continued to rise as the floods continued to affect several Thai provinces.

In Vietnam, the storm damaged nearly 2,450,385 acres of farmland and affected some 1.1 million people, killing 20. A 1111 hotline was opened to receive complaints about floods and collect food donations. The total damage to the Laos was estimated to be at 16 billion Kip or US$199,563.

The name that PAGASA gave to Nock-ten, Juaning, was retired following this storm because of the damage. In June 2012, PAGASA selected the name Jenny to replace Juaning and was used for the first time in the 2015 season. The name Nock-ten, however, was not retired after the 2011 season, but was retired after its next usage in 2016.

== See also ==
- Tropical cyclones in 2011
- Weather of 2011
- List of storms named Nock-ten
- List of storms named Juaning
- Typhoon Rammasun (2014)
- Tropical Storm Rumbia (2013)
- Tropical Storm Talas (2017)
- Tropical Storm Lionrock (2021)
- Tropical Storm Conson (2021)
- Tropical Storm Prapiroon (2024)
- Typhoon Yagi (2024)
- Tropical Storm Trami (2024)
