= Tropical Storm Talas (2017) =

Pacific severe tropical storm in 2017

Severe Tropical Storm Talas
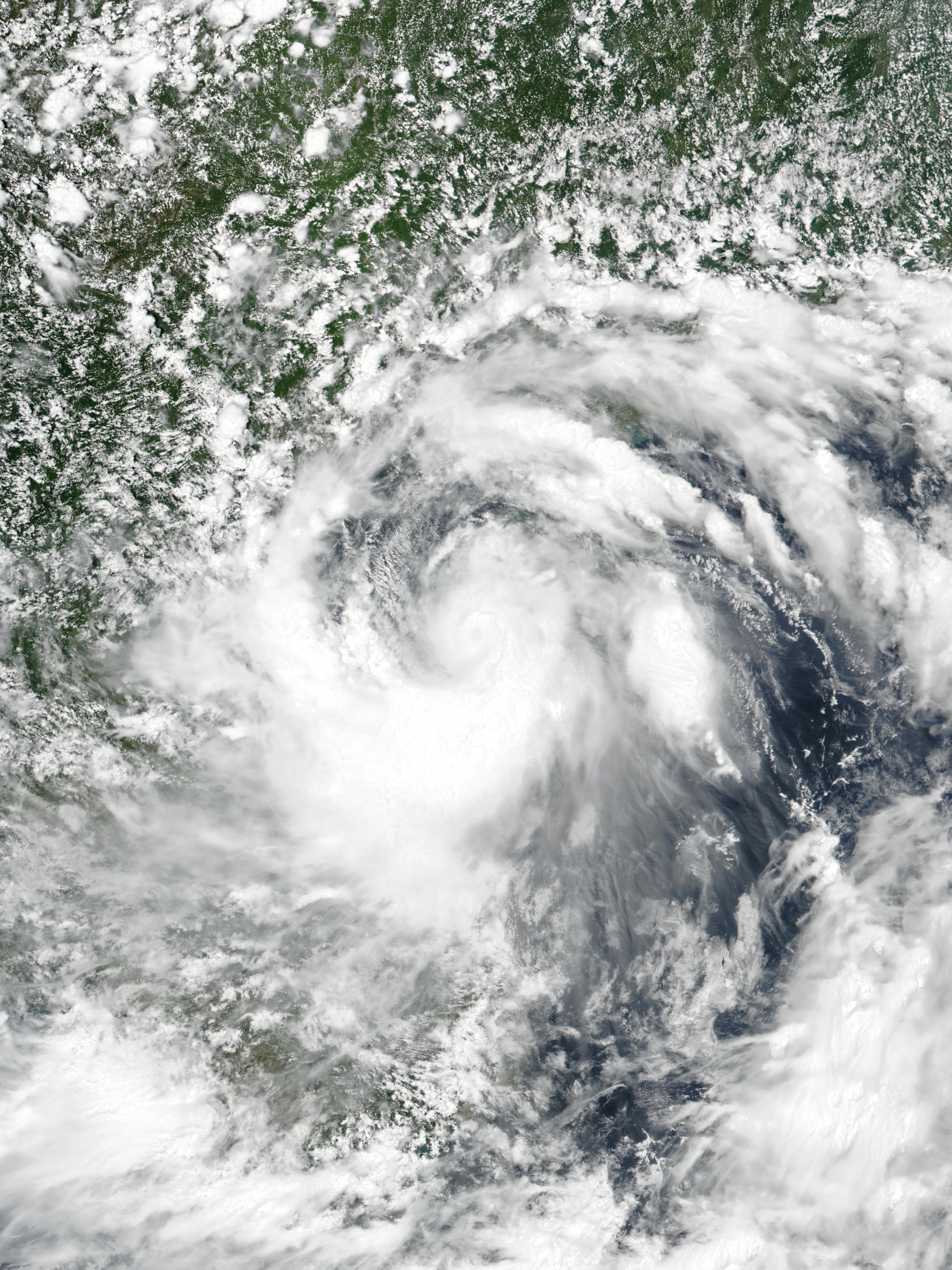
- Severe Tropical Storm Talas near peak intensity and approaching Vietnam on July 16

Meteorological history
- Formed: July 14, 2017
- Dissipated: July 17, 2017

Severe tropical storm
- 10-minute sustained (JMA)
- Highest winds: 95 km/h (60 mph)
- Lowest pressure: 985 hPa (mbar); 29.09 inHg

Tropical storm
- 1-minute sustained (SSHWS/JTWC)
- Highest winds: 95 km/h (60 mph)
- Lowest pressure: 985 hPa (mbar); 29.09 inHg

Overall effects
- Fatalities: 14 total
- Damage: $118 million (2017 USD)
- Areas affected: Vietnam, South China, Laos, Thailand, Myanmar
- IBTrACS
- Part of the 2017 Pacific typhoon season

Severe Tropical Storm Talas (Note: The name Talas (Tagalog: talas, [ˈtaː.lɐs]) was contributed by the Philippines and means "sharpness, acuteness" in Tagalog.) was a tropical cyclone that affected Vietnam in mid-July 2017. The storm was first identified as a tropical disturbance over the South China Sea on July 13 and was upgraded to a tropical depression the following day. On July 15, the depression intensified into a named storm of the 2017 Pacific typhoon season. Before making landfall in Vietnam, Talas reached its peak intensity as a severe tropical storm on July 16. It weakened to an area of low pressure on July 17 as it moved inland. Throughout Vietnam, the storm resulted in 14 fatalities and damaged approximately 2,700 homes. Rough seas caused about 50 boats to sink. Nearly 50,000 hectares (120,000 acres) of vegetable fields, around 800 ha (2,000 acres) of aquaculture, and 47,600 ha (118,000 acres) of rice and other subsidiary crops were affected. The storm caused an estimated US$8.8 million in damages in Hainan, China, increased rainfall in Myanmar and Thailand, and triggered landslides and flooding in parts of Central and Northern Laos.

== Meteorological history ==
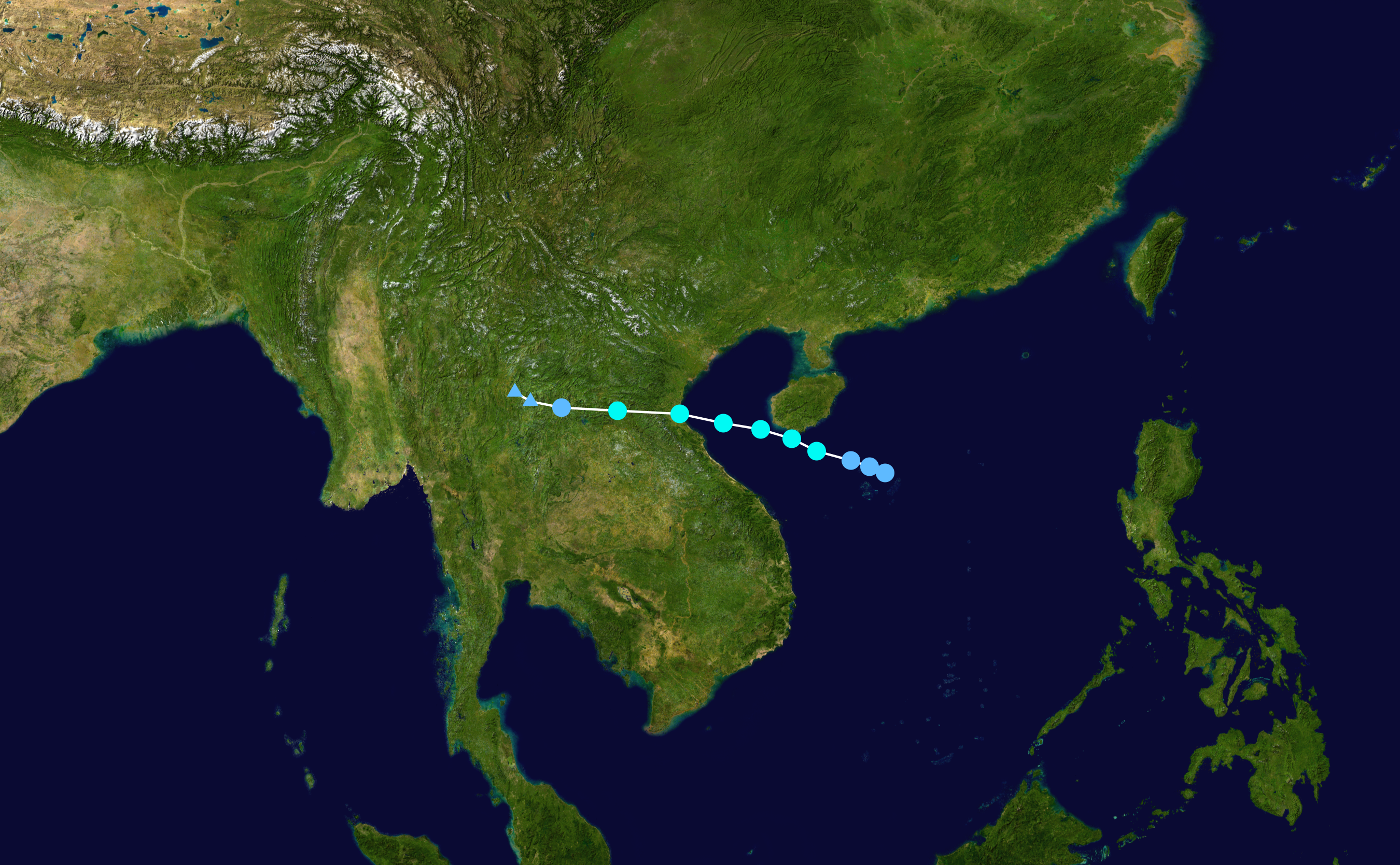
Map plotting the storm's track and intensity, according to the Saffir–Simpson scale Map key Saffir–Simpson scale Tropical depression (≤38 mph, ≤62 km/h) Tropical storm (39–73 mph, 63–118 km/h) Category 1 (74–95 mph, 119–153 km/h) Category 2 (96–110 mph, 154–177 km/h) Category 3 (111–129 mph, 178–208 km/h) Category 4 (130–156 mph, 209–251 km/h) Category 5 (≥157 mph, ≥252 km/h) Unknown Storm type Tropical cyclone Subtropical cyclone Extratropical cyclone, remnant low, tropical disturbance, or monsoon depression

Talas originated from an area of convection, positioned between two north-south oriented ridges. On July 13, the Joint Typhoon Warning Center (JTWC) began monitoring a tropical disturbance located approximately 648 km (403 mi) southeast of Hanoi, Vietnam. The Japan Meteorological Agency (JMA) classified the system as a weak tropical depression at around 06:00 UTC on July 14, as it started to move slowly towards the northwest at a speed of 19 kilometres per hour (12 mph). Six hours later, the JMA issued advisories stating that the system was producing 10-minute sustained winds of at least 55 km/h (34 mph). The JMA then upgraded it to a tropical storm, assigning it the name Talas.

The JTWC issued a Tropical Cyclone Formation Alert at 02:30 UTC on July 15, after satellite imagery depicted deep convection wrapping into its developing low-level circulation center and a favorable environment for further development in Hainan, China. As convective banding improved, the JTWC downgraded the disturbance to a tropical depression by midday on July 15. The JTWC upgraded it to a tropical storm after recording Dvorak estimates of T2.5, indicating 1-minute sustained winds of 65 km/h (40 mph).

On July 16, Talas gradually intensified as it became better organized due to a favorable environment consisting of low to moderate northeasterly vertical wind shear and good outflow to the south. At 09:00 UTC, the JMA upgraded the storm to a severe tropical storm after it attained 10-minute sustained winds of 95 km/h (59 mph) and a minimum barometric pressure of 985 hPa (29.1 inHg), reaching its peak intensity. At the same time, the JTWC recorded one-minute sustained peak winds of 95 km/h (59 mph) while trailing along Hainan.

Shortly thereafter, Talas began to weaken due to land interaction and the JMA downgraded the system back to a tropical storm. Around 18:00 UTC, the storm made landfall in Central Vietnam, near the city of Vinh. Three hours later, the JTWC issued their final advisory on Talas as it continued to degrade while progressing inland. Early in the following day, when the weakening storm was located over the northern portion of Laos, the JMA issued their final advisory as well.

== Preparations and impact ==
=== Vietnam ===
On July 15, meteorologists expected heavy rainfall from Talas. The storm made landfall near Vinh at around 18:00 UTC on July 16 as a moderate tropical storm. Vietnam's National Center for Hydro-Meteorological Forecasting recorded wind gusts up to 100 km/h (62 mph), causing damage in Nghệ An, Thanh Hóa and Hà Tĩnh provinces. Over 400 mm (16 in) of rain fell in the central and northern parts of the country in the two days before landfall, while the capital, Hanoi, received 100 mm (3.9 in).

Talas caused 14 deaths; damaged around 3,000 homes; and sank 50 boats. Power lines in three provinces were damaged as a result of the storm. The storm destroyed approximately 50,000 ha (123,555 acres) of vegetable fields, 801 ha (1,980 acres) of aquaculture farms, and 47,632 ha (117,700 acres) of rice and subsidiary crops were. The storm resulted in approximately 1.6 trillion Vietnamese đồng (approximately US$70.4 million). The total cost of other damages was estimated at ₫2.52 trillion (US$109 million). Damages in Nghệ An were reported to reach up to ₫993 billion (approximately US$43.7 million).

The storm sank a coal ship late on July 16; only three of the thirteen people on board were rescued. Seven people were injured in Quảng Bình province, where fishing boats also washed ashore on waves as high as 5 m (16 ft). The national guard rescued a boat carrying eight weather officials after the storm. On July 17, flooded streets and disrupted train services stranded more than 4,000 passengers in the capital. Railway services from Hanoi to Vinh were canceled while trains from Hanoi to Saigon were delayed by five to seven hours. The storm caused multiple severe traffic jams, and capsized a ship, injuring seven people. Eight flights were cancelled by the airline VietJet Air and other airlines cancelled an additional ten. In response to the storm, the Irrigation Department ordered every district to have an irrigation office and/or adding pumps.

=== Hainan ===
On July 22, China's National Observatory issued a "blue alert" to Hainan province and the Beibu Gulf. About 22,901 fishing boats were moved and 39,425 people working at sea farms were evacuated to Guangdong province. As the storm neared the coast, winds of 62–74 km/h (39–46 mph) were recorded around the Lingshui Li Autonomous County. Southern portions of the province received rainfall of 3–6 in (8–15 cm) and tourists were stranded on a remote island off the coast of Guangdong. Total economic losses in Hainan Province reached 24 million Renminbi (approximately US$3.5 million) and CN¥ 60 million (approximately US$8.8 million) in China overall.

=== Other areas ===
Laos, Myanmar and Thailand received strong winds and heavy rains. Rainfall increased in Thailand between 15 and 18 July, reaching a peak of 145 mm (5.7 in) on 17 July in the Phu Phiang district of Nan province. Three districts flooded as a result of rivers overflowing in Nan province, including the Nan River. The storm passed over the Laotian provinces of Xiangkhouang, Xaysomboun and Bolikhamsai early in the morning of 17 July. On that and the following day, the rain caused landslides and flash floods in areas of Central and Northern Laos.

== See also ==
- Weather of 2017
- Tropical cyclones in 2017
- Other tropical cyclones named Talas
- Typhoon Cary (1987)
- Tropical Storm Mekkhala (2008)
- Tropical Storm Nock-ten (2011)
- Typhoon Wutip (2013)
