= Typhoon Goni (2015) =

Pacific typhoon in 2015

Typhoon Goni (Ineng)
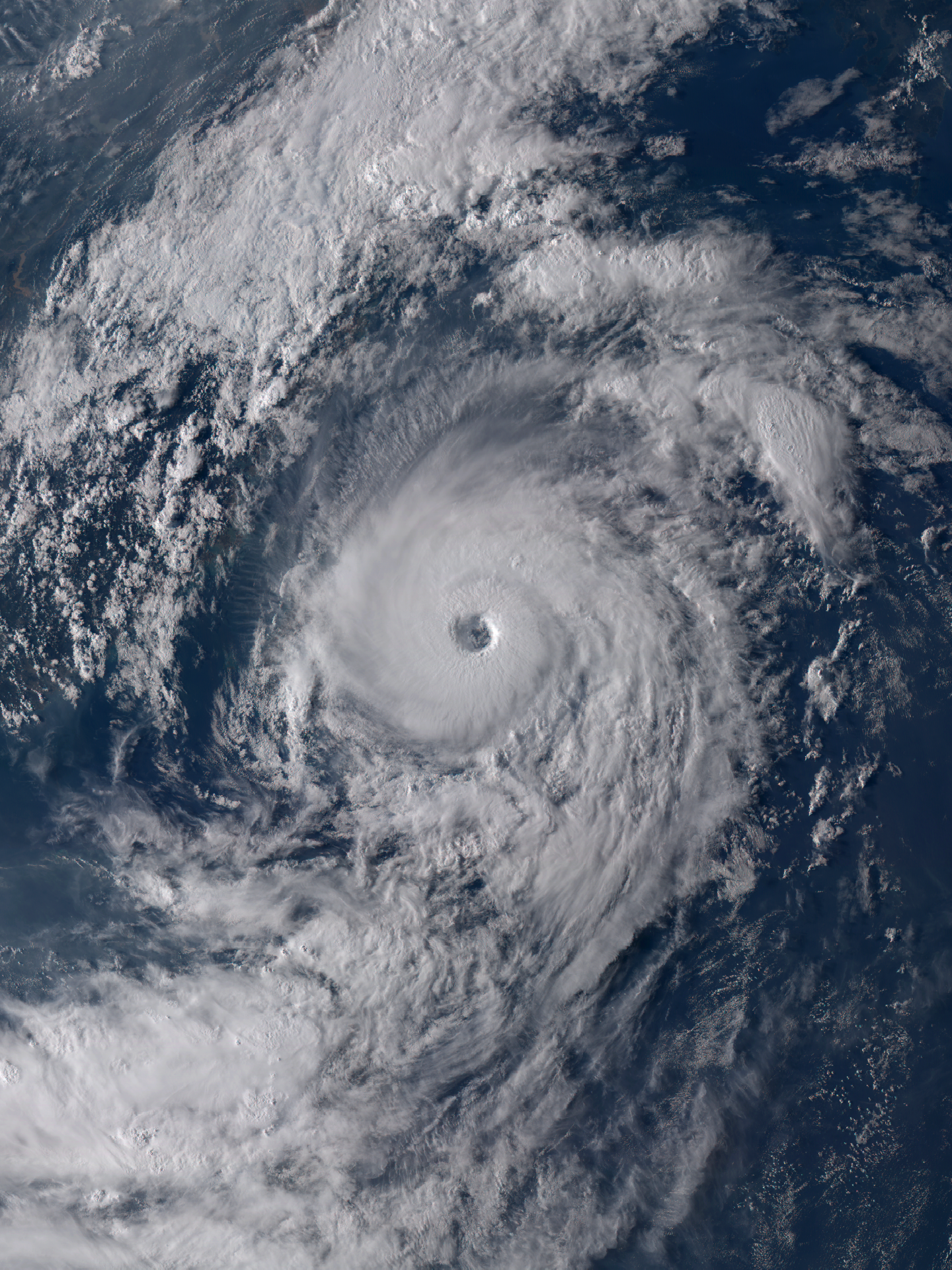
- Goni rapidly intensifying south of the Yaeyama Islands on August 23

Meteorological history
- Formed: August 13, 2015
- Extratropical: August 25, 2015
- Dissipated: August 30, 2015

Very strong typhoon
- 10-minute sustained (JMA)
- Highest winds: 185 km/h (115 mph)
- Lowest pressure: 930 hPa (mbar); 27.46 inHg

Category 4-equivalent typhoon
- 1-minute sustained (SSHWS/JTWC)
- Highest winds: 220 km/h (140 mph)
- Lowest pressure: 933 hPa (mbar); 27.55 inHg

Overall effects
- Fatalities: 74 confirmed
- Damage: $1.05 billion (2015 USD)
- Areas affected: Mariana Islands, Philippines, Taiwan, Japan, Korea, China, Russia
- IBTrACS
- Part of the 2015 Pacific typhoon season

Typhoon Goni, (Note: The name Goni (Korean: 고니, [ko̞ni]) was contributed by South Korea and means swan in Korean.) known in the Philippines as Typhoon Ineng, was a powerful and devastating tropical cyclone that affected much of East Asia in late August 2015. Developing in tandem with Typhoon Atsani to its east as the fourteenth named storm and ninth typhoon of the annual typhoon season, Goni developed on August 13, and passed through the Mariana Islands two days later. By that time, radar imagery showed a formative eye, signaling an rapidly intensifying storm. Goni evolved into an intense typhoon in the Philippine Sea before weakening and stalling north of Luzon. The typhoon re-intensified and attained peak winds of 185 km/h (115 mph) on August 23 while moving through the southern Ryukyu Islands. Goni weakened slightly and moved across the Japanese island of Kyushu. The tropical cyclone transitioned into an extratropical cyclone in the East Sea on August 25, crossed into eastern Russia and China a day later, and dissipated on August 30.

Along its path, Goni killed 74 people and left $1.05 billion (USD) in damage. (Note: All damage totals are in 2015 values of their respective currencies.) On Guam, one of the first landmasses affected, heavy rainfall caused flooding and power outages. Across northern Luzon in the Philippines, Goni also dropped intense precipitation. This resulted in deadly landslides, flooded fields, and the destruction of thousands of houses. The typhoon also brought heavy rainfall and rough seas to Taiwan and the east coast of China. In the southern Ryukyu Islands and Kyushu, high wind overturned vehicles, damaged buildings, and left over 490,000 homes without power. Off the coast of Kyushu, a man drowned amid high waves. Flooding killed 40 people in North Korea. The extratropical remnants of Goni damaged crops and flooded a zoo in eastern Russia.

== Meteorological history ==
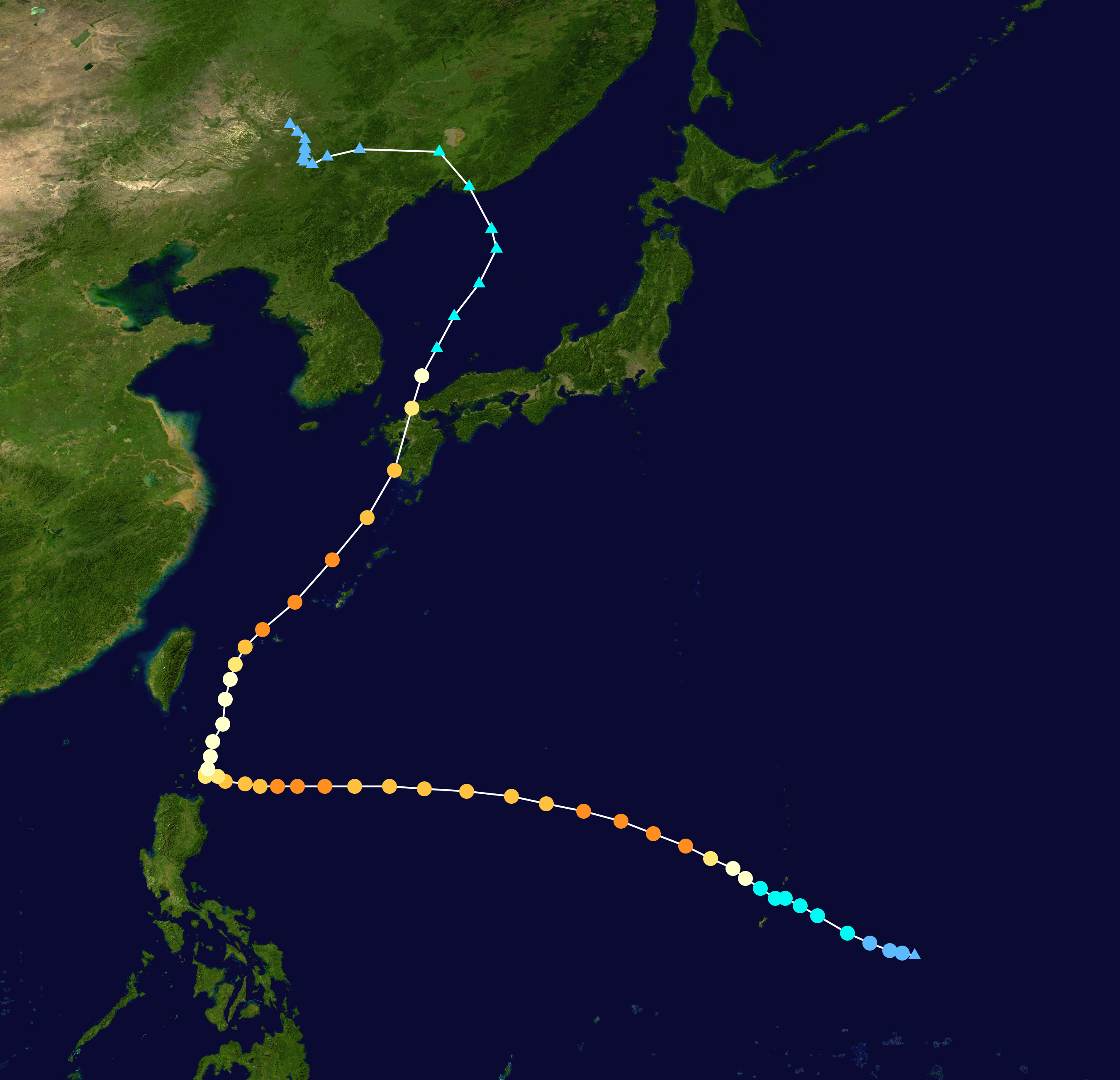
Map plotting the storm's track and intensity, according to the Saffir–Simpson scale Map key Saffir–Simpson scale Tropical depression (≤38 mph, ≤62 km/h) Tropical storm (39–73 mph, 63–118 km/h) Category 1 (74–95 mph, 119–153 km/h) Category 2 (96–110 mph, 154–177 km/h) Category 3 (111–129 mph, 178–208 km/h) Category 4 (130–156 mph, 209–251 km/h) Category 5 (≥157 mph, ≥252 km/h) Unknown Storm type Tropical cyclone Subtropical cyclone Extratropical cyclone, remnant low, tropical disturbance, or monsoon depression

In the middle of August 2015, a strong westerly wind burst along the equator produced two areas of convection, or thunderstorm activity, near the Marshall Islands in the western Pacific Ocean. The westernmost disturbance became associated with a circulation center near Ujelang Atoll. With low wind shear and favorable sea surface temperatures, tropical cyclone forecast models anticipated further development of both convective systems. The westernmost system developed a banding pattern by August 13, indicative of increased organization. At 18:00 UTC that day, the Japan Meteorological Agency (JMA) classified it as a tropical depression, centered about 700 km (430 mi) east-southeast of Guam. Early on August 14, the Joint Typhoon Warning Center (JTWC) initiated advisories on the system with the designation Tropical Depression 16W.

The nascent system tracked generally west-northwestward around a subtropical ridge to its north. Favorable outflow to the south counteracted moderate wind shear, though a tropical upper tropospheric trough to the northeast disrupted the thunderstorm structure. Late on August 14, the JMA upgraded the depression to a tropical storm, naming it Goni. The storm slowly intensified and organized as it approached the Marianas Islands on August 15. With diminished wind shear, rainbands were able to wrap tightly around the center. When Goni passed just north of Rota on August 15, radar on Guam indicated a developing eyewall in the storm's core. At 18:00 UTC on August 15, the JMA upgraded Goni to a severe tropical storm, and further to typhoon status by the next day. The previously disruptive trough to the north soon aided the storm's intensification by enhancing its outflow, and other environmental conditions remained favorable. Consequently, Goni began a period of rapid deepening on August 16. By early on August 17, Goni reached an initial peak intensity; the JMA estimated 10-minute maximum sustained winds of 175 km/h (109 mph), and the JTWC assessed higher 1-minute winds of 215 km/h (134 mph), derived from satellite intensity estimates using the Dvorak technique. At the time, the typhoon had a small eye just 9 km (5.6 mi) in diameter.

While the typhoon was moving westward toward the Philippine island of Luzon, thunderstorms in the northern eyewall deteriorated as a result of unfavorable subsidence from a high pressure system to the north. Early on August 18, the Philippine warning center PAGASA began national advisories on the typhoon, giving Goni the local name Ineng. On the next day, the typhoon rounded the subtropical ridge, co-existing with Typhoon Atsani, which developed concurrently over the western Pacific Ocean to the east. On August 21, Goni's movement became nearly stationary about 100 km (62 mi) off the northern coast of Luzon. Land interaction weakened the typhoon's convective core until a building ridge to the southeast drove Goni northeastward and allowed convection to redevelop. A new eye developed on August 23 as Goni passed east of Taiwan. The eye crossed over Iriomote-jima and Ishigaki, both part of the southern Ryukyu Islands. Late on August 23, Goni attained its peak intensity with JMA-estimated peak winds of 185 km/h (115 mph).

Goni maintained much of its strength while traversing the East China Sea, as low wind shear allowed convection to persist around the eyewall. Goni made landfall on southwestern Japan near Uki, Kumamoto, at 19:00 UTC on August 19, and shortly thereafter it struck Arao. The convection diminished while interacting with Japan's mountainous terrain, leaving the storm's center exposed once it entered the much cooler Sea of Japan. Around 12:00 UTC on August 25, Goni transitioned into an extratropical cyclone. The remnants turned northward and moved ashore near Vladivostok in the Russian Far East on August 26. Former Typhoon Goni turned westward and entered northeastern China in the province of Heilongjiang. The storm stalled over northeastern China for several days, before dissipating on August 30.

== Preparations, impact, and aftermath ==
=== Mariana Islands ===
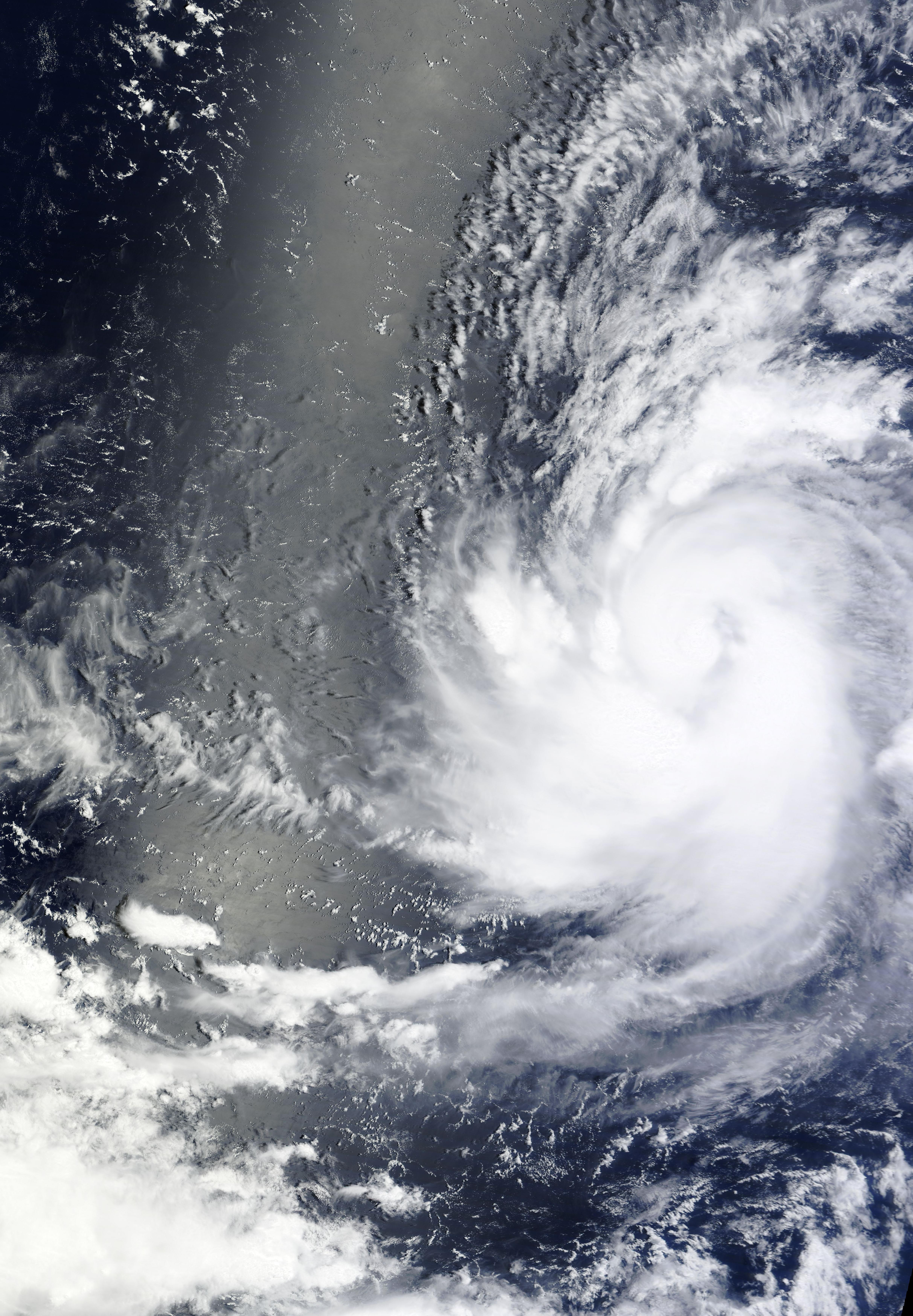
Severe Tropical Storm Goni after landfall over Guam on August 16

Tropical Storm Goni affected the Marianas Islands about two weeks after Typhoon Soudelor damaged houses in the same island chain and caused an island-wide power outage on Saipan. Damaged structures were not repaired in the interim, making airborne debris a concern. Goni's approach halted aid distribution for victims of the previous typhoon. A total of 680 people in the Marianas Islands sought shelter during the storm. One flight was cancelled, and three others were diverted.

Wind gusts of 91 km/h (57 mph) damaged Saipan's electrical system. On Guam, Andersen Air Force Base recorded sustained winds of 80 km/h (50 mph), with gusts to 93 km/h (58 mph). The storm's slow movement enabled heavy rain to fall over Guam, totaling 345 mm (13.58 in) at the National Weather Service office near the center of the island; this was enough rainfall to cause flooding, particularly on the western side of Guam. The concurrence of heavy rainfall and gusty winds caused isolated power outages on the island, with floods temporarily shutting down the Tumon power sub-station. Increased water flow along the Ugum River shut down the Ugum Water Treatment Plant, leaving some residents without water access.

=== Philippines ===
PAGASA – the Philippine Atmospheric, Geophysical and Astronomical Services Administration – started issuing advisories on Goni when the storm entered the agency's area of responsibility on August 18. The next day, the agency issued the lowest tropical cyclone warning signal for the Batanes and Cagayan provinces, later upgrading the warning to signal #3; lower-level warnings were posted for most of the Cagayan Valley, Cordillera Administrative Region, and the Ilocos Region. The National Disaster Risk Reduction and Management Council (NDRRMC) was placed on red alert in preparation for the typhoon, meaning that the agency would issue 24-hour public weather forecasts and general flood advisories. The Department of Social Welfare and Development (DSWD) pre-stocked funds, food packs, and other emergency items to be utilized in the aftermath of the typhoon. In response to the storm threat, Philippine Airlines, SKYJET Airlines, and Cebu Pacific canceled flights throughout the Philippines, 67 boats were confined to port, and most schools closed in northern Luzon. Initially, 8,426 people evacuated to emergency shelters in advance of the cyclone, drastically increasing to 397,154 people seeking shelter during the height of the storm.

While stalling north of Luzon, Goni enhanced the southwest monsoon across the Philippines, resulting in rainfall and gusty winds across the western portion of the nation. The storm spawned seven tornadoes, one of which damaged or destroyed ten houses in Carranglan, Nueva Ecija. Rough seas swamped a motor boat near Banton Island, forcing the crew of seven to swim ashore. Across Luzon, flooding caused landslides in 13 locations, including a mountain slope in Mankayan, Benguet, that buried three mining camps, killing 13 miners. More than 100 policemen and miners searched through the mud for survivors. Water levels quickly rose in rivers across Luzon, washing away 14 flood control systems, including one dyke. Swollen rivers also inundated several bridges and washed away one in Santa, Ilocos Sur, that left 5,100 people isolated. At three dams, water gates were opened after flood levels reached critical heights. Across Luzon, trees were knocked down and the power supply was disrupted; all electrical service was restored by September 1, or 11 days after the storm's closest approach. In total, Typhoon Goni damaged 5,742 houses, of which 188 were completely destroyed. Total damages amounted to ₱4.55 billion (US$97.6 million), split roughly evenly between agricultural and infrastructural impacts. In Ilocos Norte province in northwestern Luzon, damage was estimated at ₱1.8 billion (US$38.6 million). Overall, Typhoon Goni killed 33 people and left 9 missing in the Philippines, mostly due to landslides or drownings, and injured 24 others.

A state of calamity was declared in nine provinces. In response, the Philippine Department of Social Welfare and Development (DSWD), in conjunction with local governments, provided ₱15.5 million (US$332,000) toward relief funds. Various agencies, including the NDRM and the Philippine Red Cross, distributed water, meals, medicine, and blankets to affected families. The provincial government of Ilocos Norte provided seeds to farmers whose crops were damaged during the storm. The Government Service Insurance System provided ₱197 million (US$4.22 million) to pension fund holders in Abra province.

=== East Asia ===
In Taiwan, about 2,500 people in outlying islands and mountainous areas evacuated their homes, including 1,500 residents of the Wulai District near Taipai. Schools and offices closed in the district. Two locations recorded rainfall totals in excess of 150 mm (5.9 in).

Along the coast of China's Fujian province, about 5,000 people evacuated and 10,490 boats returned to port. Heavy rainfall affected eastern China while Goni was moving through the East China Sea. Pudong, near Shanghai, recorded 337 mm (13.3 in) of rainfall over three days. The remnants of Goni also brought rainfall to southeastern China, reaching 109 mm (4.3 in) in Jiaohe, Jilin. Floodwaters covered expressways and parts of Shanghai's Hongqiao Airport, delaying or halting 400 flights. Nationwide, the storm caused flooding along 15 small to medium-sized rivers in Zhejiang and Heilongjiang provinces. In Northeast China, storm rainfall increased water levels in 57 large reservoirs. Overall economic losses in the country totaled ¥204 million (US$31.9 million).

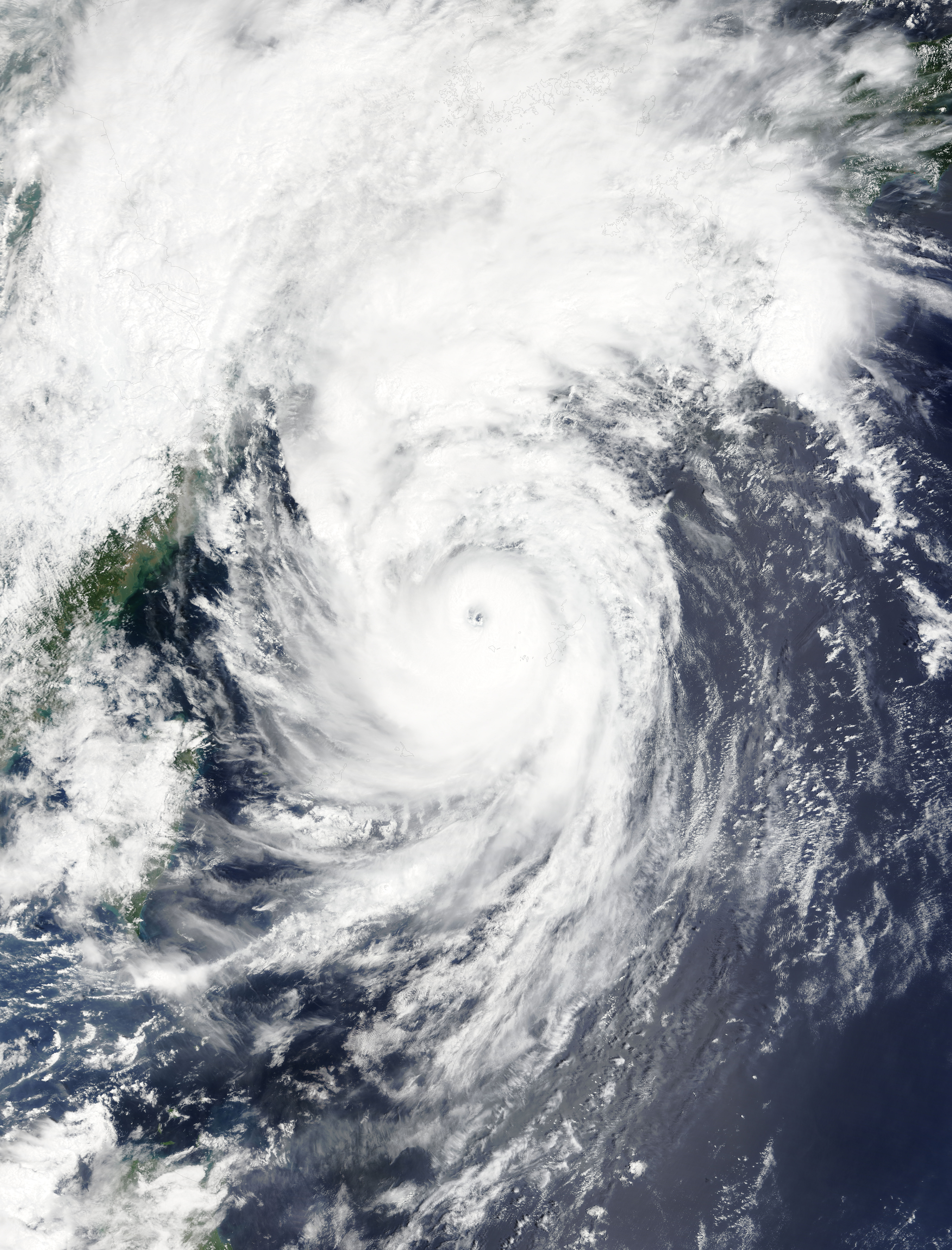
Typhoon Goni approaching Kyushu, Japan at peak intensity on August 24

The Korea Meteorological Administration warned for the potential of heavy rainfall for the provinces of Jeju, Gangwon, and North and South Gyeongsang. Rainfall was heaviest along the east coast of South Korea, peaking at 327 mm (12.9 in) in Gangwon Province and helping to ease drought conditions there. On the island of Ulleungdo off the country's east coast, wind gusts reached 130 km/h (81 mph). Along the shores of the mainland, winds reached around 90 km/h (56 mph). The stormy weather caused flights to be canceled in Ulsan and Busan. Rough seas from the storm prompted a temporary ban on swimming along beaches in Busan. The cyclone halted salvage operations of the passenger ferry MV Sewol, which capsized a year prior.

In North Korea, rainfall from Goni exceeded 300 mm (12 in) in Kangwon Province. The rains caused flash flooding in Rason near the country's borders with China and Russia, killing 40 people in the town. The floods wrecked 1,070 houses and 99 public buildings, including schools, hospitals, and nurseries. Floodwaters inundated 1.24 km^{2} (0.48 mi^{2}) of farmlands, while bridges and railroads were washed out. One road to the Chinese border was damaged, leaving 484 Chinese tourists stranded in North Korea; officials from the two countries worked to restore road access. With the 70th annual Foundation Day of the Workers' Party of Korea looming, Supreme Leader Kim Jong-un ordered troops to promptly repair the flood damage by building 1,800 new apartment houses and restoring 4,000 impacted homes. The Red Cross Society of the Democratic People's Republic of Korea provided tarps, water purification tablets, and other emergency supplies to affected residents. On September 8, the agency set up two water treatment units to provide Rason residents with clean water for a month.

To prepare for the storm in the Russian Far East, local officials advised people living along rivers and the coastline to seek shelter and to remove livestock from low-lying areas. Goni's remnants brought damaging winds and heavy rains to Primorsky Krai. Some areas received more than the average rain of two months during the storm's passage, resulting in widespread flooding. About 1,100 houses, mostly in Ussuriysk, were inundated, directly affecting 9,500 people. More than 300 buildings in Ussuriysk sustained damage. The zoo in Ussuriysk was flooded with waters 1.5 m (4.9 ft) deep after the nearby Rakovka River overflowed its banks; the animals had to be evacuated after their cages were submerged, and one bear drowned. With 88,300 hectares (218,000 acres) of crops damaged or destroyed, Goni took a heavy toll on the agriculture industry, with losses estimated at ₽2.4 billion (US$35 million). Total damage from the storm in Russia amounted to ₽8 billion (US$116.6 million). A state of emergency was declared in 10 districts, and the government provided compensation for people who lost their house or farms.

==== Japan ====
Responding to the threat of the typhoon, Japanese officials advised 600,000 people in vulnerable areas to leave their homes. Bus and air services were disrupted, affecting over 10,000 travelers. Nippon Oil suspended oil shipment at three refineries during the storm.

On August 23, Typhoon Goni passed over Iriomote-jima and Ishigaki. A station on the latter island recorded four hours of typhoon conditions, peaking with sustained winds of 162 km/h (101 mph) and gusts as high as 256 km/h (159 mph). The winds damaged buildings and upended vehicles. Five people were lacerated by broken glass on Ishigaki Island. Across the southern Ryukyu Islands, the typhoon cut power to 21,400 houses. Agricultural losses in Okinawa were estimated at ¥782 million (US$6.51 million).

Across Japan, the typhoon left ¥70 billion (US$585 million) in insured losses, along with 70 injuries. A 66-year-old man drowned amid high waves after falling from a fishing boat off Miyazaki Prefecture, on the southern island of Kyushu. The typhoon brought flooding rainfall to Japan from Okinawa northeastward to the Kantō region, with a 24-hour total of 533 mm (21.0 in) recorded in Owase on Shikoku. Goni's winds damaged houses and farming equipment, and overturned cars. Across Kyushu, the storm left over 470,000 households without power. Damage to agriculture, forestry, and fishery industries totaled ¥26 billion (US$216.3 million) nationwide.

== See also ==
- Weather of 2015
- Tropical cyclones in 2015
- Other tropical cyclones named Goni
- Other tropical cyclones named Ineng
- Typhoon Mindulle (2004) – Similar strength and damage, also stalled and weakened while heading towards Luzon
- Typhoon Shanshan (2006) – Similar strength and track, though didn't impact the Philippines
- Typhoon Tembin (2012) – Also affected much of East Asia, though had a different track and didn't cause much damage
- Typhoon Hinnamnor (2022) – Somewhat similar track, also impacted a substantial part of East Asia
