= List of storms named Ineng =

The name Ineng has been used for six tropical cyclones in the Philippine Area of Responsibility by PAGASA in the Western Pacific Ocean.

- Tropical Depression Ineng (2003) – a short-lived tropical cyclone that was only recognized by PAGASA and JMA, and eventually stayed at sea.
- Typhoon Krosa (2007) (T0715, 17W, Ineng) – a violent typhoon that struck Taiwan and China.
- Typhoon Ma-on (2011) (T1106, 08W, Ineng) – a strong typhoon which struck Japan but only caused minimal damage.
- Typhoon Goni (2015) (T1515, 16W, Ineng) – a powerful typhoon that caused widespread destruction to northern Philippines before striking Japan and South Korea.
- Severe Tropical Storm Bailu (2019) (T1911, 12W, Ineng) – made landfall on Taiwan and then in Fujian, China.
- Tropical Storm Yun-yeung (2023) (T2313, 12W, Ineng) – a weak tropical storm that affected Japan.

Preceded by Hanna	Pacific typhoon season names Ineng	Succeeded by Jenny

A variation of the name, Ining, was also used by PAGASA's predecessor, the Philippine Weather Bureau, for two tropical cyclones:

- Typhoon Louise (1964) (T6431, 46W, Ining) – a violent typhoon that brought destruction to Palau and central and southern Philippines, claiming at least 577 lives.
- Typhoon Irma (1971) (T7135, 37W, Ining) – an intense typhoon which paralleled the Philippine and Japanese coasts but remained at sea throughout its existence.
