= Typhoon Cary (1987) =

Pacific typhoon in 1987

Typhoon Cary (Ising)
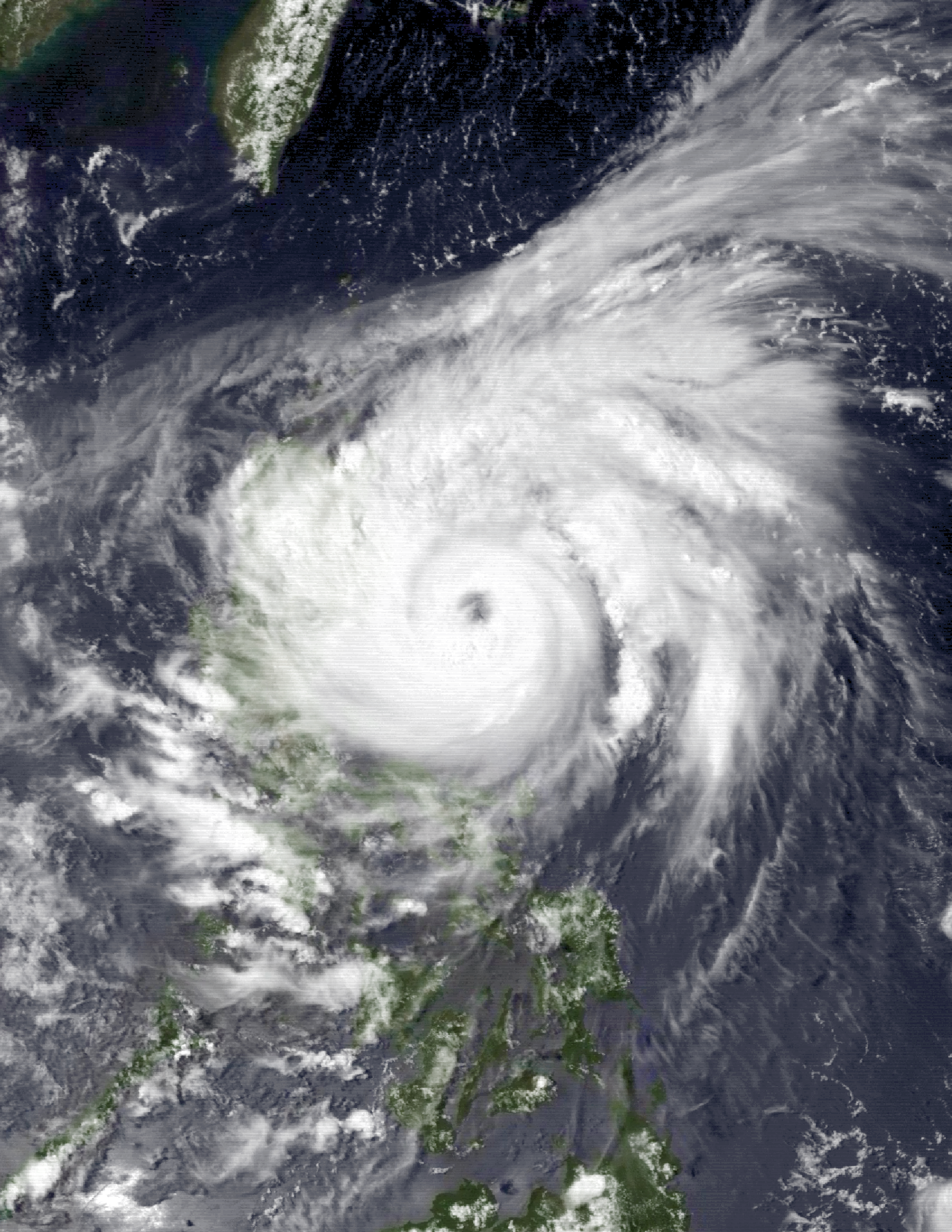
- Typhoon Cary on August 17

Meteorological history
- Formed: August 7, 1987
- Dissipated: August 24, 1987

Typhoon
- 10-minute sustained (JMA)
- Highest winds: 140 km/h (85 mph)
- Lowest pressure: 960 hPa (mbar); 28.35 inHg

Category 2-equivalent typhoon
- 1-minute sustained (SSHWS/JTWC)
- Highest winds: 155 km/h (100 mph)

Overall effects
- Fatalities: 25
- Damage: $5.58 million (1987 USD)
- Areas affected: Philippines, Hainan, Hong Kong, Vietnam
- IBTrACS
- Part of the 1987 Pacific typhoon season

Typhoon Cary, known as Typhoon Ising in the Philippines, was the second of two tropical cyclones to affect Vietnam in a week. An area of disturbed weather developed southwest of Pohnpei on August 6, 1987. The system initially remained disorganized, but by August 14, Cary had attained tropical storm intensity. After initially moving north-northwest, Cary turned west-northwest, although intensification was slow to occur. On August 15, Cary was upgraded into a typhoon, and on August 17, the typhoon peaked in intensity. Typhoon Cary then made landfall in northern Luzon while at peak intensity. Across the Philippines, 954 houses were damaged and an additional 89 were destroyed, which left 55,567 people, or 13,247 families that were either homeless or otherwise sought shelter. Five people died in the country while damage totaled $5.58 million (1987 USD), including $1.45 million from agriculture and $4.13 million from infrastructure. The storm weakened over land, but re-intensified into a typhoon over the South China Sea. On August 21, Typhoon Cary passed just south of Hainan, where hundreds of homes were damaged but no fatalities occurred, and subsequently entered the Gulf of Tonkin. The storm weakened as it approached Vietnam, and on August 23, the storm dissipated inland over Laos. Across Vietnam, almost 40,000 ha (98,840 acres) of land were flooded or destroyed. Twenty people were killed and many others were injured.

== Meteorological history ==
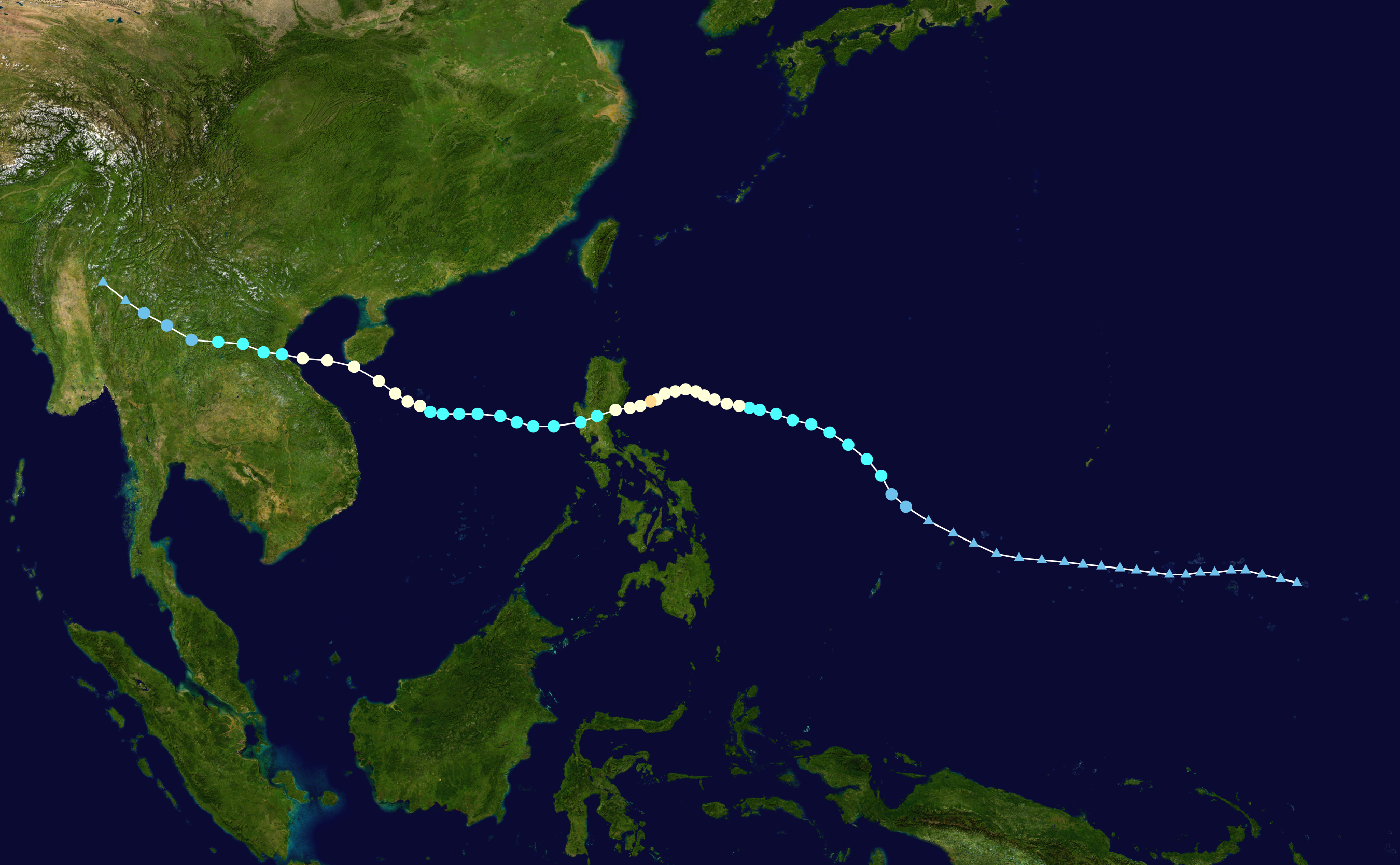
Map plotting the storm's track and intensity, according to the Saffir–Simpson scale Map key Saffir–Simpson scale Tropical depression (≤38 mph, ≤62 km/h) Tropical storm (39–73 mph, 63–118 km/h) Category 1 (74–95 mph, 119–153 km/h) Category 2 (96–110 mph, 154–177 km/h) Category 3 (111–129 mph, 178–208 km/h) Category 4 (130–156 mph, 209–251 km/h) Category 5 (≥157 mph, ≥252 km/h) Unknown Storm type Tropical cyclone Subtropical cyclone Extratropical cyclone, remnant low, tropical disturbance, or monsoon depression

The origins of Typhoon Cary can be traced back to an area of disturbed weather that first developed within the monsoon trough on August 6 about 370 km (230 mi) southwest of Pohnpei, which is located in the eastern Caroline Islands. The next day, the Joint Typhoon Warning Center (JTWC) started watching the system. On August 8, the Japan Meteorological Agency (JMA) followed suit. (Note: The Japan Meteorological Agency is the official Regional Specialized Meteorological Center for the western Pacific Ocean.) Over the ensuing four days, the storm's circulation remained broad and its convection was poorly organized. On August 12, upper-level outflow improved in all four quadrants, which resulted in the JTWC issuing a Tropical Cyclone Formation Alert (TCFA). At 23:02 UTC, Hurricane Hunters measured flight level winds of 105 km/h (65 mph) and a minimum barometric pressure of 996 mbar (29.4 inHg). Based on this and satellite intensity estimates of 80 km/h (50 mph), the JTWC upgraded the disturbance into Tropical Storm Cary while the storm was located around 1,580 km (980 mi) east-southeast of Manila. However, post-season analysis by the JTWC revealed that this occurred at 12:00 UTC on August 12.

Following behind Typhoon Betty, Cary initially moved north-northwest, only to turn west-northwest under the influence of a subtropical ridge to the storm's north. Initially, Betty's outflow inhibited development, but conditions aloft became more favorable once Betty weakened and passed over the Philippines. Dvorak intensity estimates suggested that the typhoon began to rapidly intensify. However, a Hurricane Hunter aircraft fix around midday on August 14 revealed that the storm was actually weakening and its center was becoming difficult to locate. Despite these developments, the JMA upgraded Cary into a tropical storm at noon that day. (Note: Wind estimates from the JMA and most other basins throughout the world are sustained over 10 minutes, while estimates from the United States-based Joint Typhoon Warning Center are sustained over 1 minute. 10-minute winds are about 1.14 times the amount of 1-minute winds.) Around this time, the Philippine Atmospheric, Geophysical and Astronomical Services Administration (PAGASA) also started tracking the storm and assigned it with the name Ising. Early on August 15, the JTWC reported that Cary attained typhoon intensity, while the JMA upgraded Cary into a severe tropical storm. The final Western Pacific Hurricane Hunter mission – associated with the 54th Weather Reconnaissance Squadron – was flown through Cary later that day, reporting winds of 115 km/h (70 mph) and a barometric pressure of 990 mbar (29 inHg). This was significantly lower than the Dvorak-based 170 km/h (105 mph) operational estimate from the JTWC. At around 12:00 UTC on August 16, the JMA classified Cary as a typhoon. Shortly thereafter, a ragged eye appeared on satellite imagery. At 06:00 UTC on August 17, the JTWC also estimated Cary reached its peak intensity, with winds of 160 km/h (100 mph). Six hours later, the JMA estimated that Cary attained winds of 135 km/h (85 mph), its peak intensity.

Shortly after attaining maximum intensity, Typhoon Cary turned slightly south of west and made landfall on eastern Luzon. Cary weakened steadily over land, and both the JMA and JTWC estimated that Cary weakened below typhoon intensity. After entering the South China Sea, however, Cary turned west and began to re-intensify. On the morning of August 19, the JMA re-upgraded Cary into a typhoon, with the JTWC following suit 36 hours later. At 18:00 UTC on August 21, Cary passed less than 30 km (19 mi) south of Hainan as a minimal typhoon. Accelerating towards the west, Typhoon Cary emerged into the Gulf of Tonkin before making landfall at noon on August 12 in northern Vietnam. At the time of landfall, the JTWC and JMA estimated winds of 70 mph (115 km/h) and 60 mph (95 km/h) respectively. the JTWC stopped tracking the system immediately after landfall, but the JMA continued to follow the system through the day of August 23 as the cyclone moved into northern Laos. The remnants of Cary eventually tracked into Burma before losing its identity.

== Preparations and impact ==
=== Philippines ===
Typhoon Cary threatened the Philippines less than a week after the country was devastated by Typhoon Betty. To avoid a repeat of Betty, much of northern Luzon was placed under a typhoon alert. Storm warnings were issued for the metropolitan area of Manila. Philippine Airlines canceled flights between Manila and three cities in northern Luzon. Schools were closed in several provinces over the northern portion of Luzon.

Near where the typhoon moved ashore, in Dagupan, authorities shut off water and electricity. A total of 1,800 people were evacuated in the resort town of Baguio, which is located 160 km (100 mi) north of Manila, due to landslides. The typhoon leveled a banana plantation in the Pangasinan province and caused floods that damaged two bridges in Ilocos and Cagayan provinces. Across the capital city of Manila, heavy rains led to street flooding. Nationwide, 954 homes were damaged and an additional 89 were destroyed, which resulted in 55,567 people or 13,247 families that either south shelter or were homeless. Five people were killed in the country. The storm inflicted $5.58 million in damage to the country, including $1.45 million from agriculture and $4.13 million from infrastructure. (Note: All Philippine currencies are converted to United States Dollars using Philippines Measuring worth with an exchange rate of the year 1987.)

=== Elsewhere ===
The typhoon passed close to Hainan Island on August 21, where hurricane-force winds and torrential rain resulted in the disruption of water and electrical services. Hundreds of houses were damaged and more than 500 ha (1,235 acres) of crops were destroyed, but no deaths on the island occurred. After passing Hainan Island, the storm passed close enough to prompt a No 1. hurricane signal for Hong Kong, but this warning was dropped on August 20 as the storm receded. In all, the storm brought isolated showers to the area, with rainfall peaking at 45.5 mm (1.79 in) at the Hong Kong Royal Observatory. A peak wind gust of 94 km/h (58 mph) was measured in Tai Mo Shan. Throughout the vicinity of Hong Kong, no deaths or damage were reported.

Cary struck Vietnam six days after Betty, resulting in additional flooding rains across the area. Throughout the coastal provinces of Thanh Hoa, Ha Nam Ninh, Thái Bình and Haiphong, floodwaters from the storm overflowed dikes. Furthermore, storm surge and heavy rains damaged 30,350 ha (75,000 acres) of rice fields and more than 5,060 ha (12,500 acres) of other cultivated land in Nghe Tinh. There, the storm damaged many houses, warehouses, schools, and medical facilities. Further south, 3,035 ha (7,500 acres) of rice fields were inundated in Binh Tri Thien. Overall, 20 people were killed in the country and several others were injured.

== See also ==
- Typhoon Betty (1987)
- Typhoon Dan (1989)
- Tropical Storm Talas (2017)
