= List of storms named Goni =

The names Goni and Koni (Korean: 고니, [ko̞ni]) have been used for four tropical cyclones in the West Pacific Ocean. (Note: The variant Koni was used before the spelling was corrected by the ESCAP/WMO Typhoon Committee.) The name, contributed by South Korea, means swan in Korean.

- Tropical Storm Koni (2003) (T0308, 08W, Gilas) – a Category 1-equivalent typhoon by the JTWC that struck the Philippines and Hainan.
- Tropical Storm Goni (2009) (T0907, 08W, Jolina) – interacted with Typhoon Morakot.
- Typhoon Goni (2015) (T1515, 16W, Ineng) – a typhoon that made landfall in the Philippines at Category 4 intensity, then in Japan at Category 3 intensity.
- Typhoon Goni (2020) (T2019, 22W, Rolly) – a violent Category 5-equivalent super typhoon that became the strongest storm to ever hit the Philippines in terms of one-minute sustained winds.

The name Goni was retired following the 2020 season and was replaced with Gaenari (Korean: 개나리, [ˈkɛ(ː)na̠ɾi]), which refers to Forsythia koreana.

- Tropical Storm Gaenari (2026) (T2620, Neneng) – a tropical storm that was never recognized by the JTWC since Haishen a month ago.

== See also ==
Storms with similar names

- Cyclone Gonu (2007) – a North Indian Ocean super cyclonic storm that became the strongest tropical cyclone on record in the Arabian Sea.
- Cyclone Keni (2018) – a Category 3 South Pacific severe tropical cyclone.
- Hurricane Keoni (1993) – a Category 4 Pacific hurricane that crossed into the West Pacific Ocean.
- Cyclone Kofi (2014) – a Category 2 South Pacific tropical cyclone.
