= List of storms named Nock-ten =

The name Nock-ten (Lao: ນົກເຕັນ, [nok̚˧ ten˩]) was used for three tropical cyclones in the West Pacific Ocean. The name, contributed by Laos, means kingfisher in Lao.

- Typhoon Nock-ten (2004) (T0424, 28W, Tonyo) – a strong typhoon which affected Taiwan and Japan, claiming 3 lives.
- Tropical Storm Nock-ten (2011; T1108, 10W, Juaning) – a Category 1 typhoon that struck the Philippines and Vietnam, killing 128 people and causing damage worth US$126 million.
- Typhoon Nock-ten (2016; T1626, 30W, Nina) – the strongest tropical cyclone ever recorded on Christmas Day; made landfall in Philippines, causing 13 fatalities and $123 million worth of damage.

The name Nock-ten was retired following the 2016 season and was replaced with Hinnamnor (Lao: ຫີນໜາມໜໍ່, [hiːn˩ naːm˩ nɔː˧]), which refers to Hin Namno National Park in Laos.

== See also ==
- Tropical Storm Nokaen (2026) – a West Pacific tropical storm with a similar name.
