= List of storms named Juaning =

The name Juaning has been used for three tropical cyclones in the Philippine Area of Responsibility in the West Pacific Ocean:

- Tropical Storm Morakot (2003) (T0309, 10W, Juaning) – a tropical storm which was recognized as a Category 1-equivalent typhoon by the Joint Typhoon Warning Center (JTWC).
- Severe Tropical Storm Faxai (2007) (T0720, 20W, Juaning) – a short-lived tropical storm that paralleled the Japanese coast.
- Severe Tropical Storm Nock-ten (2011) (T1108, 10W, Juaning) – another tropical storm which was considered by JTWC as a Category 1-equivalent typhoon; devastated the Bicol Region killing 128 people, and eventually affected northern Luzon, Hainan and northern Vietnam,.

The name Juaning was retired following the 2011 season and replaced with Jenny.
