= Typhoon Etau (2003) =

Pacific typhoon in 2003

Typhoon Etau (Kabayan)
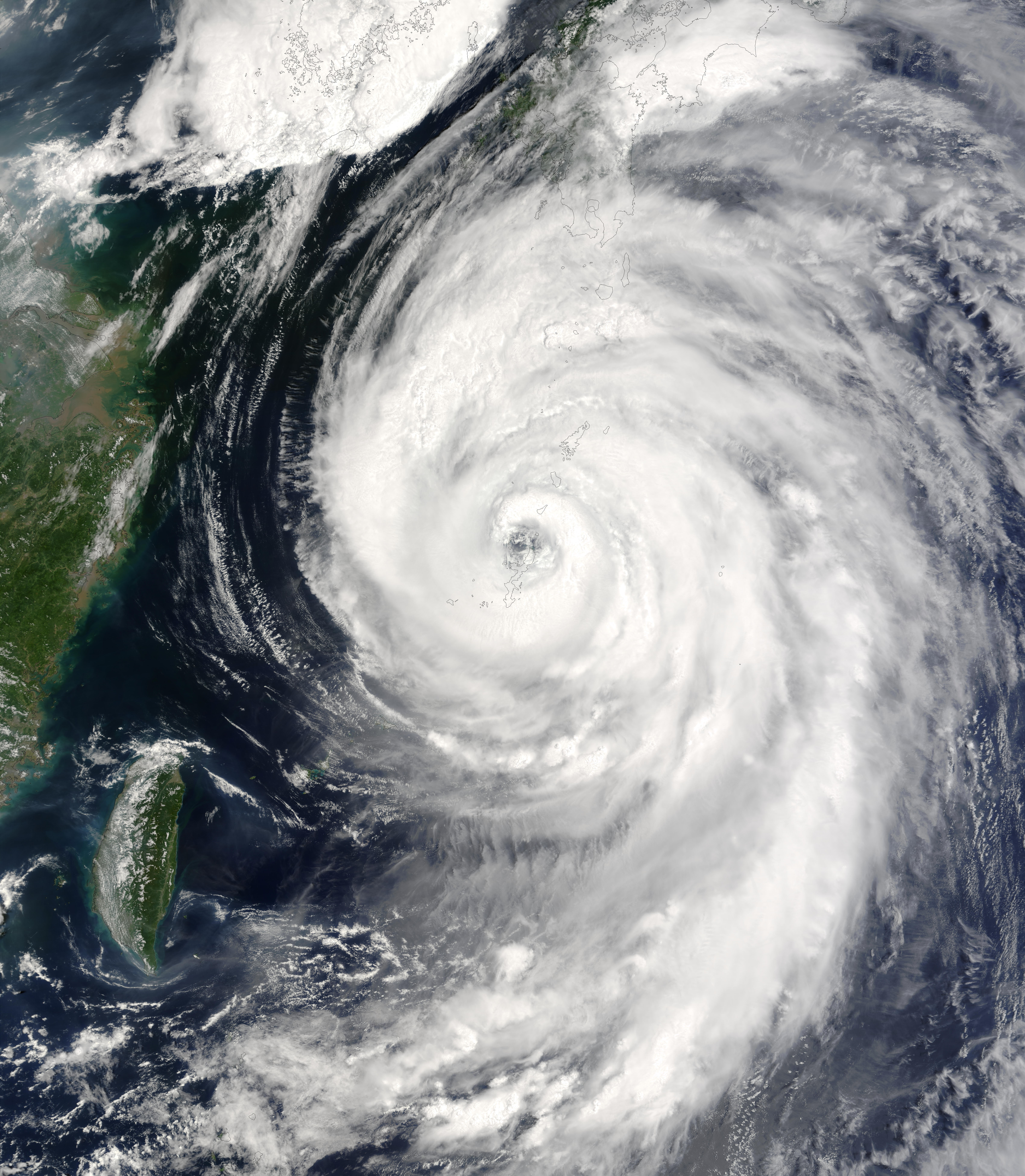
- Typhoon Etau near peak intensity on August 7

Meteorological history
- Formed: August 2, 2003
- Extratropical: August 9, 2003
- Dissipated: August 12, 2003

Very strong typhoon
- 10-minute sustained (JMA)
- Highest winds: 155 km/h (100 mph)
- Lowest pressure: 945 hPa (mbar); 27.91 inHg

Category 3-equivalent typhoon
- 1-minute sustained (SSHWS/JTWC)
- Highest winds: 205 km/h (125 mph)
- Lowest pressure: 933 hPa (mbar); 27.55 inHg

Overall effects
- Fatalities: 20
- Damage: $825 million (2003 USD)
- Areas affected: Northern Marianas Islands, Philippines, Japan, Kuril Islands
- IBTrACS
- Part of the 2003 Pacific typhoon season

Typhoon Etau, (Note: The name Etau (Palauan: chetau, [ʔə.ˈtaw]) was contributed by the United States and means a "brief squall of thunderstorms" in Palauan.) known in the Philippines as Typhoon Kabayan, was a tropical cyclone that produced near-record winds and rainfall in Japan in early August 2003. The tenth named storm and fifth typhoon of the 2003 Pacific typhoon season, Etau developed on August 2, and gradually intensified while moving to the northwest. Etau formed an eye and became a large storm by the time it approached Okinawa on August 7. The typhoon attained peak winds of 155 km/h (96 mph) before weakening slightly while turning to the northeast. Etau made landfall on the Japanese island of Shikoku on August 8, and later moved across portions of Honshu and Hokkaido. After weakening to tropical storm status, the cyclone became extratropical on August 9 and dissipated three days later.

While passing northeast of the Philippines, the typhoon caused light damage in the archipelago. The eye crossed over Okinawa, where Etau left 166,800 people without power and caused 10 injuries. Near where Etau first struck Japan, Muroto reported a peak wind gust of 166 km/h (103 mph), at the time the third strongest on record there. The typhoon also dropped torrential rainfall peaking at 683 mm (26.9 in). The combination of winds and rainfall caused landslides, particularly on Hokkaido. Nationwide, Etau killed 20 people, destroyed 708 houses, and caused ¥98.1 billion (JPY, $824 million USD) in damage. (Note: All damage totals are in 2003 values of their respective currencies.)

== Meteorological history ==
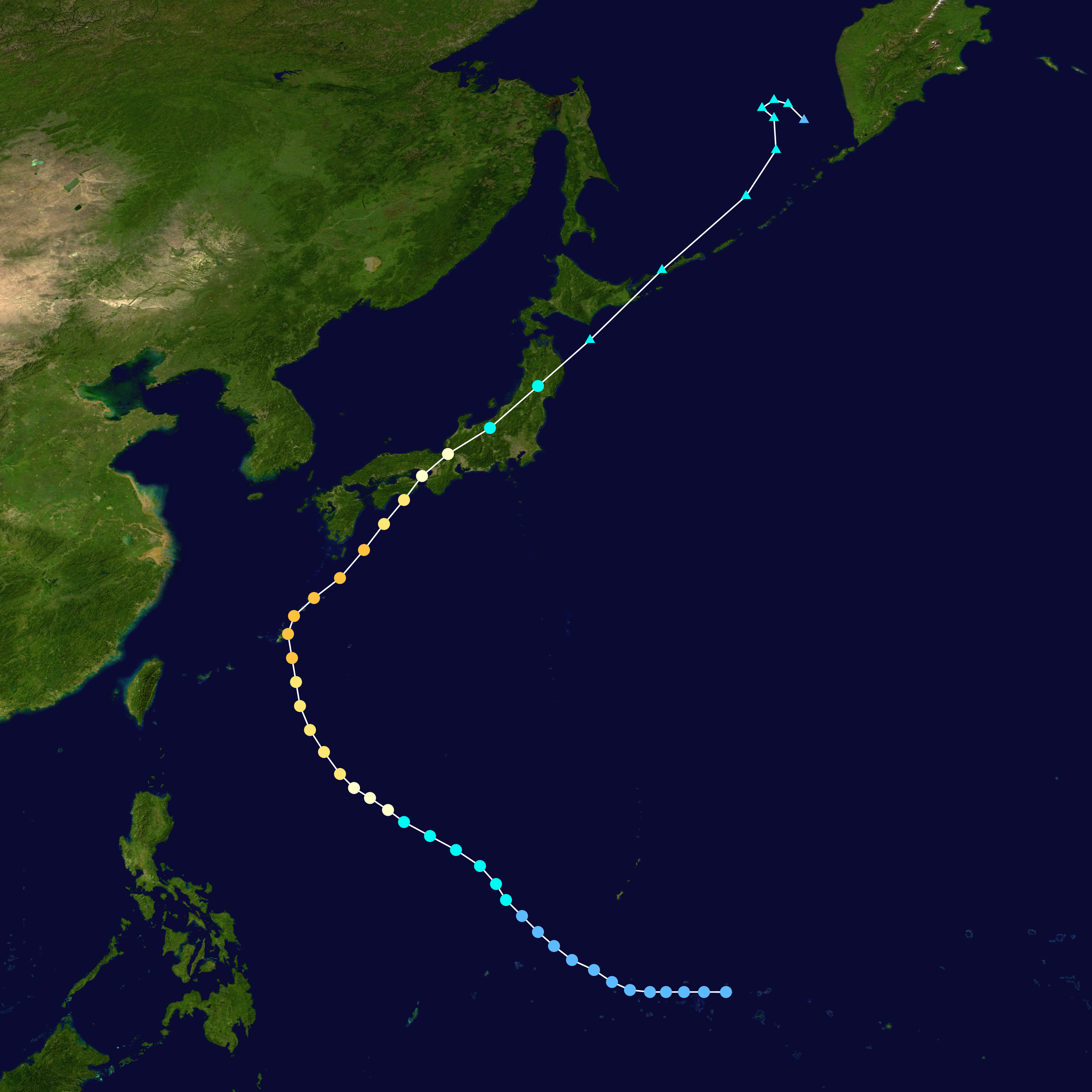
Map plotting the storm's track and intensity, according to the Saffir–Simpson scale Map key Saffir–Simpson scale Tropical depression (≤38 mph, ≤62 km/h) Tropical storm (39–73 mph, 63–118 km/h) Category 1 (74–95 mph, 119–153 km/h) Category 2 (96–110 mph, 154–177 km/h) Category 3 (111–129 mph, 178–208 km/h) Category 4 (130–156 mph, 209–251 km/h) Category 5 (≥157 mph, ≥252 km/h) Unknown Storm type Tropical cyclone Subtropical cyclone Extratropical cyclone, remnant low, tropical disturbance, or monsoon depression

The origins of Typhoon Etau were from an area of convection that persisted along the west side of a weak circulation near Chuuk State on July 31. With initially moderate but steadily decreasing wind shear, the system was able to organize as it moved generally westward. On August 2, the Joint Typhoon Warning Center (JTWC) (Note: The Joint Typhoon Warning Center is a joint United States Navy – United States Air Force task force that issues tropical cyclone warnings for the western Pacific Ocean and other regions.) initiated advisories on Tropical Depression 11W. That day, another circulation was developing on the western side of the system, briefly classified by the Taiwan Central Weather Bureau as a tropical depression. The eastern circulation became dominant with pronounced outflow to the south, although it was initially broad and elongated. Later on August 2, the Japan Meteorological Agency (JMA) (Note: The Japan Meteorological Agency is the official Regional Specialized Meteorological Center for the western Pacific Ocean.) classified the system as a tropical depression to the northeast of Yap.

With a subtropical ridge in the vicinity of the Marianas Islands, the nascent depression moved to the northwest. On August 3, the JMA upgraded the depression to tropical storm status, naming it Etau. An upper-level low to the northeast improved northerly outflow, allowing the storm to strengthen quickly. On August 4 the Philippine Atmospheric, Geophysical and Astronomical Services Administration (PAGASA) began issuing advisories as the storm approached the region, naming it Kabayan. Late on August 4, the JMA upgraded Etau to typhoon status, with the storm later developing an eye. An approaching shortwave trough weakened the ridge, causing Etau to turn more to the north. At around 0030 UTC on August 7, the typhoon made its closest approach to Okinawa, passing within 120 km (75 mi), and close enough for the 100 km (62 mi) wide eye to cross over the island. Later that day, the JMA estimated peak maximum sustained winds of 155 km/h (96 mph), sustained over a duration of 10 minutes; the JTWC estimated 1 minute winds of 205 km/h (127 mph).

After reaching peak winds, Etau began turning to the north-northeast due to the approaching trough, passing near Amami Ōshima. By that time, the typhoon had become large, with gale-force winds extending 870 km (540 mi) in diameter. Increasing wind shear and cooler air caused Etau to weaken. The typhoon still maintained 10 minute winds of 140 km/h (87 mph) when it made landfall near Muroto on the Japanese island of Shikoku, shortly before 1300 UTC on August 8. Continuing northeastward, the typhoon weakened into a severe tropical storm as it passed near Awaji Island, before making landfall on Honshu near Nishinomiya at 2100 UTC on August 8. While accelerating to the northeast, Etau lost tropical characteristics over land. After briefly reaching open waters to the northeast of Honshu, the storm made its final landfall near Erimo, Hokkaido at 1630 UTC on August 9, shortly before becoming extratropical. This was based on analysis from the JMA, whereas the JTWC assessed the storm remaining offshore Hokkaido. The remnants of Etau entered the Sea of Okhotsk and persisted for several more days, dissipating on August 12 to the west of the Kamchatka Peninsula.

== Preparations and impact ==
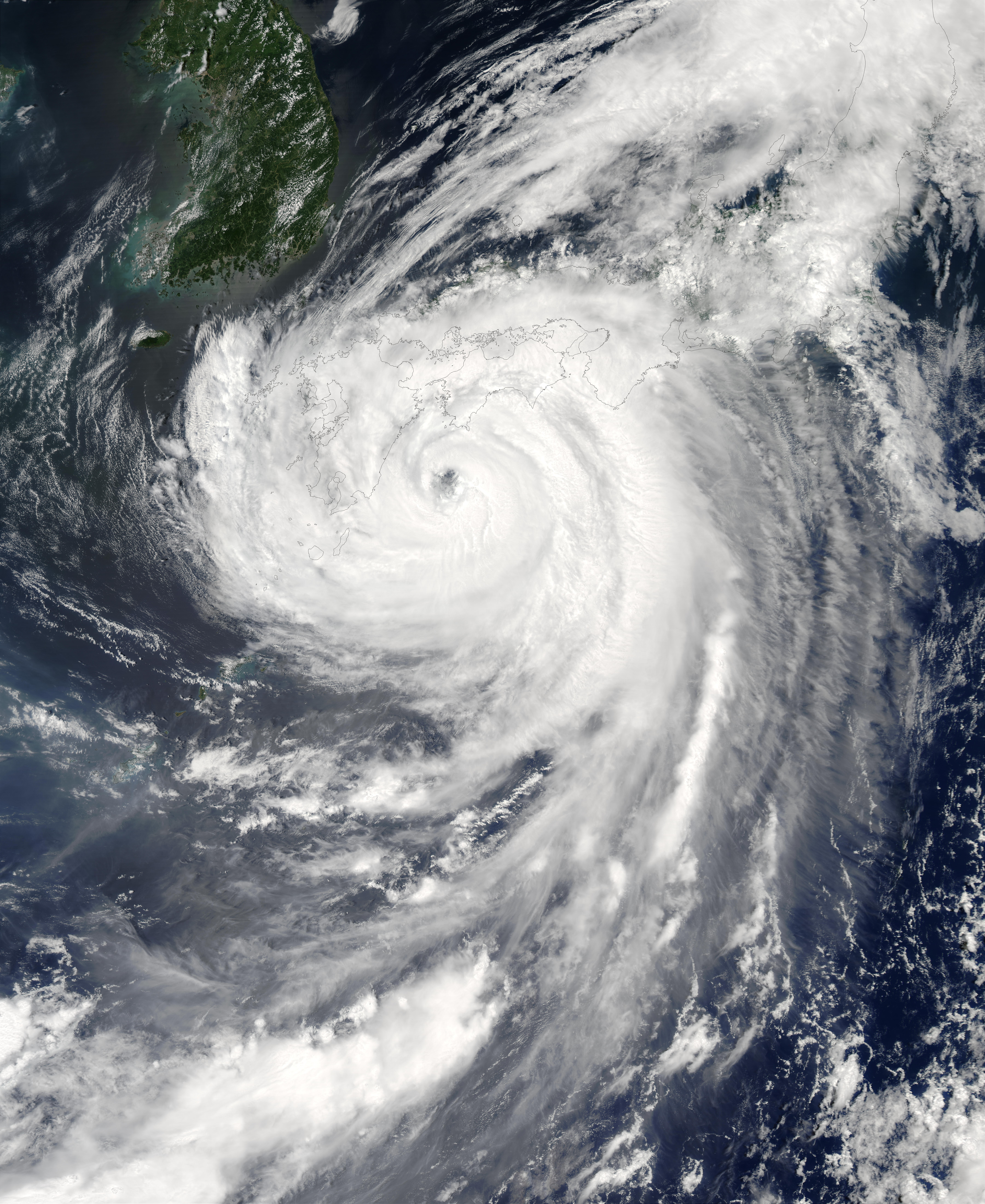
Typhoon Etau approaching Japan on August 8

Rough waves from Typhoon Etau produced rip currents on Saipan that swept up four swimmers, who were later rescued after holding onto a buoy. The outer periphery of the storm caused P36 million (PHP, $655,000 USD) in damage, (Note: The total was originally reported in Philippine pesos. Total converted via the Oanda Corporation website.) mostly to infrastructure with some minor crop damage. Late in its duration, Etau caused damage in Russia's Kuril Islands.

While Etau was in the vicinity of Okinawa, wind gusts at Kadena Air Base reached 181 km/h (112 mph). Rainfall on Okinawa peaked at 215 mm (8.5 in), while on nearby Yakushima to the north, rainfall reached 57 mm (2.2 in). Throughout Okinawa prefecture, the typhoon left 166,800 buildings without power due to the strong winds. Etau damaged seven buildings, blocked one road, and caused moderate damage to crops and fisheries. In the Amami Islands, about 45,000 houses, lost power due to high winds from the storm, affecting 53% of residents. Etau injured ten people in the island group, including one man who was blown off his roof. Officials closed the Naha Airport due to the typhoon, causing 293 flights in the region to be canceled. Ahead of the storm, ExxonMobil oil refineries in Okinawa were closed, but were reopened after sustaining minimal damage.

On Shikoku, Muroto reported typhoon-force winds for eight hours, and wind gusts peaked at 166 km/h (103 mph). At the time, this was the third strongest gust ever reported there, behind Typhoon Nancy in 1961 and Typhoon Shirley in 1965. Sustained winds there reached 180 km/h (110 mph). In Tokushima Prefecture, Etau dropped heavy rainfall peaking at 683 mm (26.9 in), although similarly heavy totals of 639 and 543 mm (25.2 and 21.4 in) were reported in Kōchi and Miyazaki prefectures, respectively. About 95% of the rainfall total in Kōchi fell in 24 hours. In Miyazaki, a station reported an hourly rainfall total of 79 mm (3.1 in). Rainfall at Biratori, Hokkaido reached 306.2 mm (12.06 in) in a 48‑hour period, the highest at the station since records began in 1962. The heavy rainfall caused landslides across Hokkaido, particularly in areas where rainfall totaled over 330 mm (13 in). In the area around the Saru River, shallow landslides displaced about 13,000,000 m^{3} (460,000,000 ft^{3}) of soil, of which about 190,000 m^{3} (6,700,000 ft^{3}) entered the river. This caused the highest sediment levels in the river since the 1960s, washing about 50,000 m^{3} (1,800,000 ft^{3}) into the Nibutani Dam. Landslides also swept about 65,000 m^{3} (2,300,000 ft^{3}) of soil and trees into the Appetsu River, which caused additional damage by washing away adjacent homes and bridges. In addition the rainfall, Etau spawned a weak tornado near Kumagaya on the Honshu mainland, rated around an F1. The typhoon brought a plume of warm air to the country that caused the warmest temperatures of the year at that point.

The heavy rainfall in Tokushima caused landslides and blocked roads, resulting in disruptions to bus and train service. Strong winds overturned a truck, injuring the two occupants. In Muroto, several people were injured by flying glass. Rough waves killed two people in the same city, one in Fukuoka, damaged the seawall in Kyoto, and damaged 25 ships. In Takamatsu, Kagawa, Etau left about ¥1.24 billion (JPY, $10.4 million USD) in crop damage, mainly due to damaged greenhouses. Two workers were killed in Higashiuwa after being swept away by a river. On Hokkaido, heavy rainfall caused landslides, damaging hundreds of roads and bridges and isolating several villages. River flooding swept away a vehicle in Kamishihoro, killing the five occupants. Along Mount Poroshiri, 29 people were rescued by helicopter from a mountain lodge after Etau blocked off their descending trail.

Throughout Japan, Etau caused over 1,000 flights to be canceled, and for bullet trains to operate at a slower speed, causing delays. About 62,000 people lost power during the storm, and across the country. The typhoon destroyed 708 houses and flooded 2,253 others, causing over 6,000 people to evacuate to storm shelters. About 295 ha (730 acres) of fields were damaged. Throughout Japan, Etau killed 20 people and injured 93 others, 19 of them seriously. Overall damage totaled ¥98.1 billion (JPY, $824 million USD). (Note: The total was originally reported in Japanese yen. Total converted via the Oanda Corporation website.) Largely because Etau remained tropical and weakened over Japan, damage was much less than Typhoon Tokage a year later, which produced comparable rainfall totals at a similar intensity but struck the country while extratropical.

== See also ==
- Tropical cyclones in 2003
- Weather of 2003
- Other tropical cyclones named Etau
- Other tropical cyclones named Kabayan
- Typhoon Neoguri (2014)
- Typhoon Tokage (2004)
