= List of storms named Kabayan =

The name Kabayan has been used for six tropical cyclones in the Philippine Area of Responsibility by PAGASA in the Western Pacific Ocean. The name means “countrymen” or "fellow citizen" in Tagalog.

- Typhoon Etau (2003) (T0310, 11W, Kabayan) – struck Japan
- Typhoon Peipah (2007) (T0721, 21W, Kabayan) – struck the Philippines
- Typhoon Muifa (2011) (T1109, 11W, Kabayan) – approached Japan, China and Korea
- Typhoon Mujigae (2015) (T1522, 22W, Kabayan) – a destructive Category 4 typhoon that formed just east of the Philippines and made landfall in Guangdong, China
- Tropical Storm Kajiki (2019) (T1914, 16W, Kabayan) – formed after 3 storms devastated the Philippines with heavy rains.
- Tropical Storm Jelawat (2023) (T2317, 18W, Kabayan) – a weak tropical storm which caused heavy rainfall throughout Mindanao and Visayas.

| Preceded by Jenny | Pacific typhoon season names Kabayan | Succeeded by Liwayway |
