= List of storms named Jenny =

The name Jenny has been used for seven tropical cyclones worldwide: twice in the Atlantic Ocean, three times in the Philippine Area of Responsibility in the West Pacific Ocean, once in the Australian region, and once in the South-West Indian Ocean.

In the Atlantic:

- Hurricane Jenny (1961) – did not affect land.
- Tropical Storm Jenny (1969) – a weak tropical storm which affected Cuba and the U.S. Gulf Coast.

In the West Pacific, where Jenny replaced Juaning:

- Typhoon Dujuan (2015) (T1521, 21W, Jenny) – a powerful typhoon which struck the Ryukyu Islands, Taiwan, and Fujian.
- Tropical Storm Podul (2019) (T1912, 13W, Jenny) – made landfall in the Philippines and later in Vietnam.
- Typhoon Koinu (2023; T2314, 14W, Jenny) – lashed Southern Taiwan and Batanes.

In the Australian region:

- Cyclone Jenny (1974) – a Category 2 tropical cyclone that struck northern Western Australia.

In the South-West Indian:

- Cyclone Jenny (1962) – struck Reunion; killed 36.

== See also ==
- Cyclone Jenna (2026) – an Australian region severe tropical cyclone with a similar name.

Preceded by Ineng	Pacific typhoon season names Jenny	Succeeded by Kabayan
