= Typhoon Nock-ten =

Pacific typhoon in 2016

Typhoon Nock-ten (Nina)
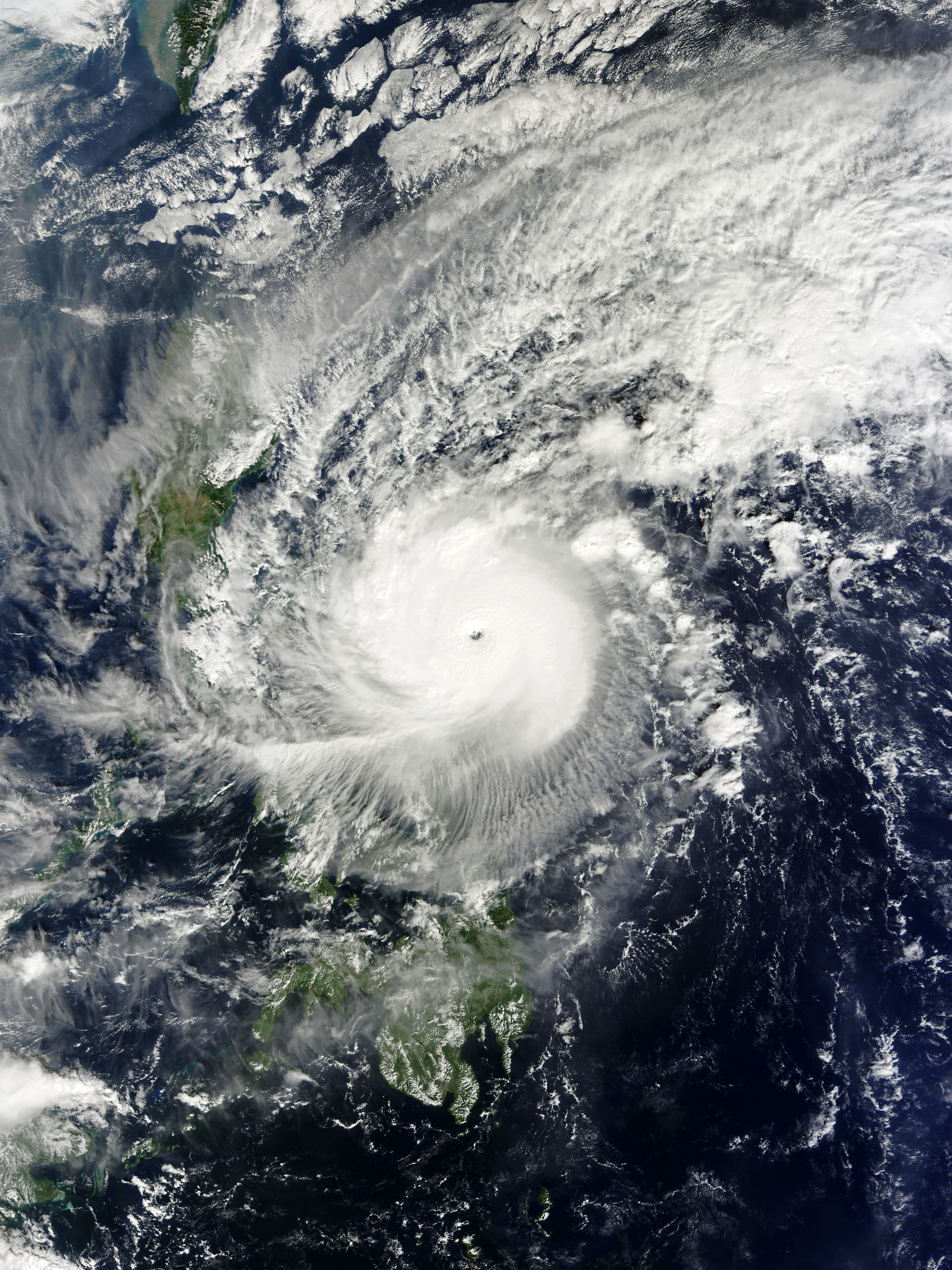
- Nock-ten approaching the Philippines at peak intensity on December 25

Meteorological history
- Formed: December 20, 2016
- Dissipated: December 28, 2016

Violent typhoon
- 10-minute sustained (JMA)
- Highest winds: 195 km/h (120 mph)
- Lowest pressure: 915 hPa (mbar); 27.02 inHg

Category 5-equivalent super typhoon
- 1-minute sustained (SSHWS/JTWC)
- Highest winds: 260 km/h (160 mph)
- Lowest pressure: 918 hPa (mbar); 27.11 inHg

Overall effects
- Fatalities: 13
- Damage: $123 million (2016 USD)
- Areas affected: Caroline Islands, Philippines, Vietnam
- IBTrACS
- Part of the 2016 Pacific typhoon season

Typhoon Nock-ten, (Note: The name Nock-ten (Lao: ນົກເຕັນ, [nok̚˧ ten˩]) was contributed by Laos and means kingfisher in Lao.) locally named Nina, was a powerful late-season tropical cyclone that affect the Philippines in late-December 2016. Forming as a tropical depression southeast of Yap and strengthening into the twenty-sixth tropical storm of the annual typhoon season on December 21, 2016, Nock-ten intensified into the thirteenth typhoon of the season on December 23. Soon afterwards, the system underwent explosive intensification and became a Category 5-equivalent super typhoon early on December 25. Nock-ten weakened shortly afterwards before making eight landfalls over the Philippines. The typhoon weakened rapidly due to the landfalls as it entered the South China Sea on December 26, turned southwest, and ultimately dissipated on December 28 due to the winter monsoon.

Nock-ten was the third typhoon to have caused significant impacts in the Philippines, after typhoons Sarika and Haima only two months prior, both of which struck similar areas at a similar intensity. 13 people were known to have been killed by Nock-ten. Damage totals were estimated upwards of US$127.5 million, and because of this, the names Nock-ten and Nina were retired by the Japan Meteorological Agency and PAGASA from their respective tropical cyclone name lists. They were replaced by Hinnamnor and Nika respectively.

== Meteorological history ==
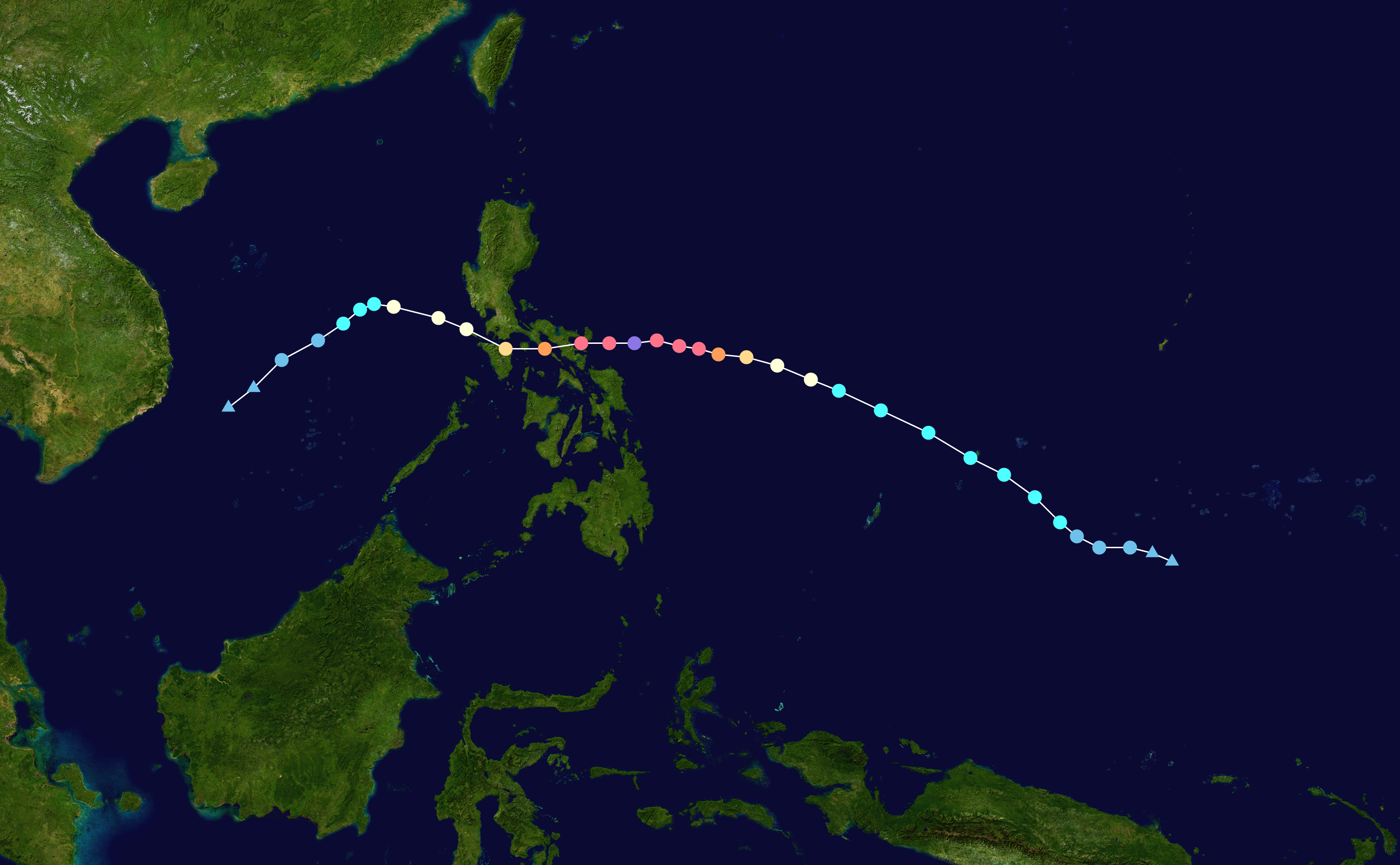
Map plotting the storm's track and intensity, according to the Saffir–Simpson scale Map key Saffir–Simpson scale Tropical depression (≤38 mph, ≤62 km/h) Tropical storm (39–73 mph, 63–118 km/h) Category 1 (74–95 mph, 119–153 km/h) Category 2 (96–110 mph, 154–177 km/h) Category 3 (111–129 mph, 178–208 km/h) Category 4 (130–156 mph, 209–251 km/h) Category 5 (≥157 mph, ≥252 km/h) Unknown Storm type Tropical cyclone Subtropical cyclone Extratropical cyclone, remnant low, tropical disturbance, or monsoon depression

On December 20, the Japan Meteorological Agency started to monitor a tropical depression that had formed about 1,090 km (675 mi) to the southeast of Yap Island in the Federated States of Micronesia. The broad and poorly organized system was being affected by moderate to high vertical wind shear, which was being offset by warm sea surface temperatures. Soon, the JTWC upgraded the system to a tropical depression, with the designation of 30W, based on improved environmental conditions and an ASCAT image. Late on the same day, when central convection was increasing and consolidating over a defined low-level circulation center (LLCC), both the JMA and the JTWC upgraded it to a tropical storm, with the former assigning the name Nock-ten. One day later, late on December 22, the JMA upgraded the system to a severe tropical storm, and Nock-ten started to form an eye revealed by microwave imagery.

Tracking west-northwestward and then westward along the southern periphery of a deep-layered subtropical ridge, Nock-ten intensified into a typhoon at noon UTC on December 23. Immediately after that, explosive intensification commenced with a sharp eye embedded in a symmetric central dense overcast feature. At 06:00 UTC on December 24, Nock-ten reached its peak intensity with estimated ten-minute maximum sustained winds of 195 km/h (120 mph) and the central pressure at 915 hPa (27.02 inHg); therefore, it was the latest-forming typhoon of such intensity or stronger on record. The JTWC also upgraded Nock-ten to a Category 4-equivalent super typhoon, when the system was in an area of low vertical wind shear, excellent dual-channel outflow, and sea surface temperatures of 29 °C. Although the eye became cloud-filled in the afternoon, it cleared again late on the same day and while the JMA did not raise its intensity estimate further, the JTWC did so.

On December 25, the JTWC reported that the Dvorak technique analyses at 03:00 UTC from "all reporting agencies" indicated a T-number of 7.0; therefore, the JTWC added a non-synoptic entry to the operational best track for that time, indicating one-minute maximum sustained winds of 260 km/h (160 mph), equivalent to Category 5 on the Saffir–Simpson scale. However, land interaction soon impacted the typhoon, as its convective cloud tops had become warmer. Later, Nock-ten made landfall over the Philippines eight times: Bato, Catanduanes at 18:30 PST (10:30 UTC) and Sagñay, Camarines Sur at 21:30 PST (13:30 UTC) on December 25; San Andres, Quezon at 02:00 PST (18:00 UTC), Torrijos, Marinduque at 04:30 PST (20:30 UTC), Verde Island, Batangas at 09:15 PST (01:15 UTC), Tingloy, Batangas at 10:10 PST (02:10 UTC), Calatagan, Batangas at 11:40 PST (03:40 UTC), and Lubang Island, Occidental Mindoro at 13:00 PST (05:00 UTC) on December 26.

The eight landfalls significantly eroded Nock-ten, and the structure became much more asymmetric and ragged. Thus, when Nock-ten emerged into the South China Sea early on December 26, it had weakened into a minimal typhoon. Subsequently, although Nock-ten's structure briefly improved, it was downgraded to a severe tropical storm by the JMA and a tropical storm by the JTWC early on December 27, as its LLCC had started to become exposed. Poleward outflow was no longer offsetting the effects of strong vertical wind shear, leading to rapid weakening. After the JMA downgraded the system to a tropical storm at 09:00 UTC, Nock-ten further weakened to a tropical depression late on the same day. Influenced by a Northeast Monsoon surge, the system accelerated southwestward, and convection was unable to develop over the fully exposed LLCC due to high vertical wind shear and colder dry air. The JTWC issued its final warning for the system early on December 28, and the tropical depression dissipated in the afternoon.

== Preparations, impact, and aftermath ==
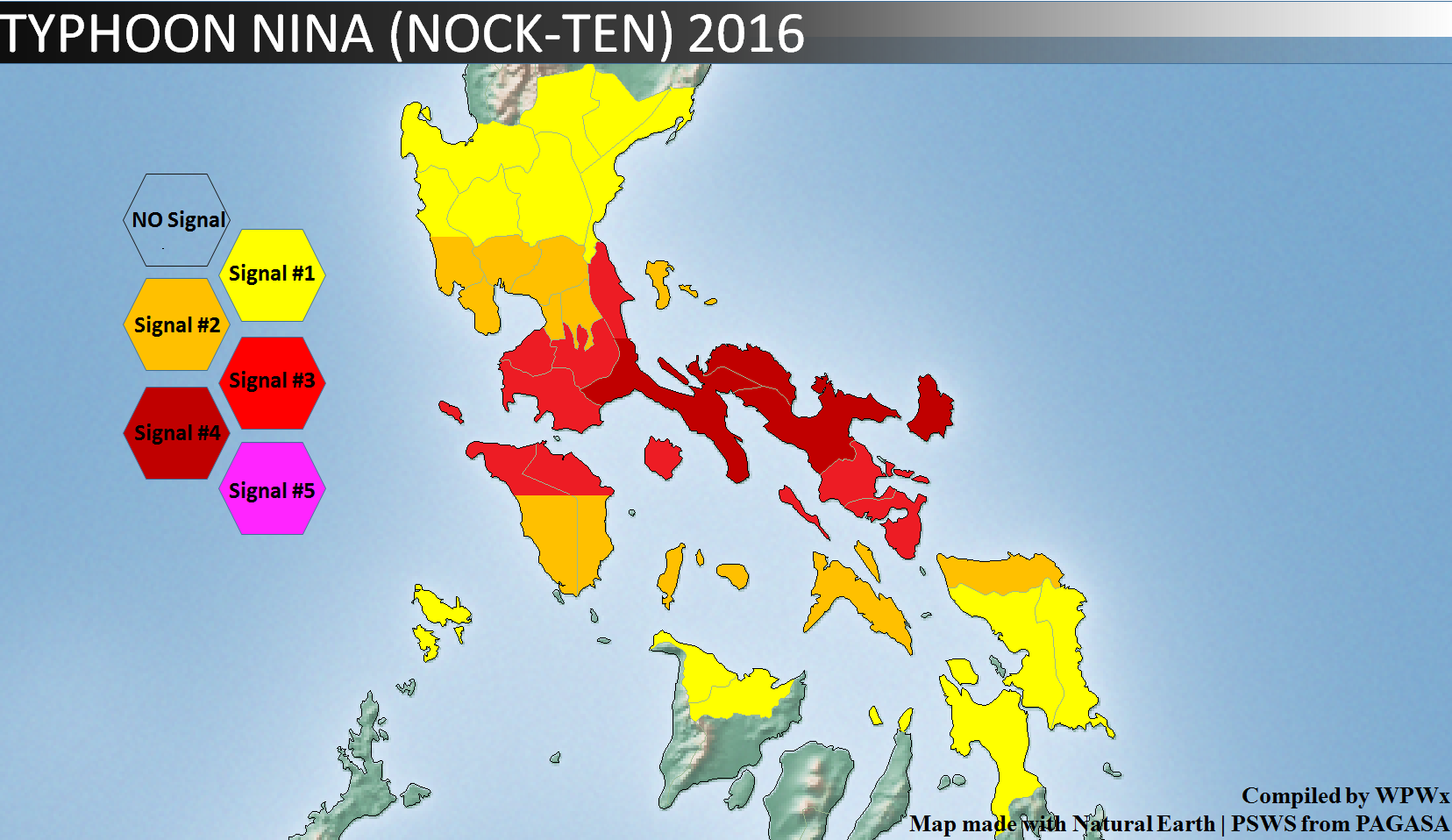
Highest PSWS raised by PAGASA across the Philippines in relation to Typhoon Nina (Nock-Ten)

PSWS#	Luzon	Visayas	Mindanao
4	Camarines Norte, Camarines Sur, Catanduanes, Southern Portion of Quezon	None	None
3	Albay, Burias Island, Marinduque, Batangas, Lubang Island, Cavite, Laguna, Northern Portion of Oriental Mindoro, Northern Portion of Occidental Mindoro, Rest of Quezon, Sorsogon, Southern Portion of Metro Manila	None	None
2	Rizal, Bulacan, Bataan, Pampanga, Southern Portion of Zambales, Polillo Islands, Rest of Occidental Mindoro, Rest of Oriental Mindoro, Romblon, Masbate including Ticao Island, Rest of Metro Manila	Northern Samar	None
1	Rest of Zambales, Tarlac, Nueva Ecija, Nueva Vizcaya, Quirino, Aurora, Pangasinan, Calamian Group of Islands	Samar, Eastern Samar, Biliran, Leyte, Rest of Cebu, Aklan, Capiz	None

Nock-ten made eight landfalls in the Philippines. On December 24, PAGASA issued Signal No. 1 for Camarines Norte, Camarines Sur, Albay, Catanduanes, Sorsogon, Masbate including Ticao and Burias Islands, Northern Samar and Eastern Samar. The next day, Catanduanes and Camarines Sur were placed in Signal No. 4, Signal No. 2 were issued for Metro Manila, Masbate including Ticao Island, Oriental Mindoro, Barangas, rest of Quezon including Polillo, Occidental Mindoro including Lubang Island, Romblon, Cavite, Rizal, Bulacan, Bataan, and Northern Samar, Signal No. 1 were placed for Pangasinan, Nueva Ecija, Aurora, Quirino, Nueva Vizcaya, Zambales, Pampanga, Tarlac, Calamian Group of Islands, Aklan, Capiz, Zambales, Pampanga, Tarlac. Calamian Group of Islands, Aklan, Samar, Biliran, Leyte, and Bantayan Island. On December 27, all signals were lowered.

According to the NDRRMC, a total of 98,771 families were preemptively evacuated in CALABARZON, MIMAROPA, Bicol, and Eastern Visayas region. A total of 13 people have been reported dead and damage was estimated at ₱6.12 billion (US$123 million), including ₱5.06 billion to agriculture and ₱1.05 billion to infrastructure. A total of 313,767 homes were damaged and 228,538 homes were partially damaged. 71,648 homes were totally damaged in Bicol Region. In Camarines Sur, 137,779 homes were total damaged, three people were killed and damage was estimated at ₱3.00 billion. Damage was estimated at ₱854 million in Albay. One child drowned in Boac, Marinduque. A total of 28,405 homes were partially damaged in Quezon, including 14,537 homes in San Francisco. Two people were killed in Mulanay, including one person killed due to failing tree. Four people were killed in Polangui, Albay. Two deaths were reported in the province, including one person due to drowning, and monetary damage was estimated at to ₱713 million, including ₱4.7 million to government structures, 4,097 homes were partially damaged in Calapan in Oriental Mindoro. Six flights owned by EVA Airways were canceled. Damage in Catanduanes was estimated at ₱324 million. Damage in Occidental Mindoro was estimated at ₱249 million. In Tiwi, 50 percent of homes were severely damaged. At least 364 flights were canceled. Mayor Jaime Villanueva described as the "strongest to strike the Bicol region in 10 years". A total of six provinces, two cities were declared a state of calamity.

On December 26, 2016, MV Starlite Atlantic sank off the coast of Tingloy, Batangas during the onslaught of the typhoon. The vessel was anchored in Batangas Bay when the typhoon passed over it with winds of up to 185 km/h in the center and gusts of 215 km/h. The typhoon generated huge waves between six and eight meters in height, causing the vessel to come off its mooring and drift toward Tingloy where it sank. One person died and 18 were reported missing in the incident, while the Philippine Coast Guard rescued 15 out of the 34 crew.

== Naming and Retirement ==
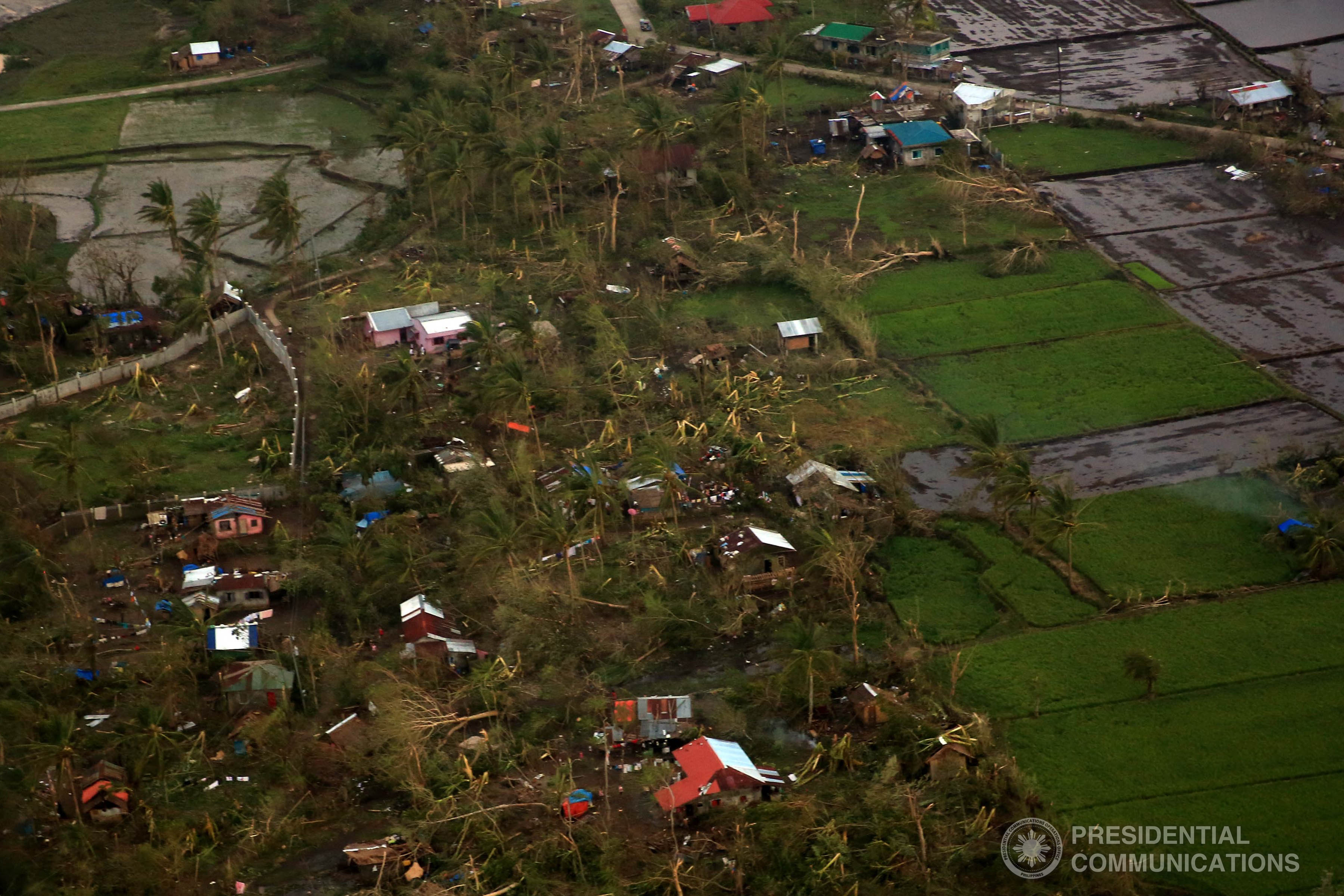
Aerial photo shows the damage of Typhoon Nock-ten to the communities of Camarines Sur.

Nina has been assigned to 20 tropical cyclones worldwide, with PAGASA assigned it to five tropical cyclones within their area of responsibility; it was last assigned to Typhoon Prapiroon in 2012. After incurring over ₱1 billion in damages, PAGASA announced that Nina had retired from their naming lists; subsequently on January 17, 2017, PAGASA announced that they selected Nika to supersede Nina for the 2020 season.

On the other hand, during the 49th annual session of the ESCAP/WMO Typhoon Committee during 2017, they announced that the Nock-ten had also removed from the naming lists. In March 2018, the Typhoon Committee officially chose Hinnamnor as its replacement name; and it was first (and only) used in the 2022 season.

== See also ==
- Weather of 2016
- Tropical cyclones in 2016
- List of storms named Nock-ten
- List of Philippine typhoons (2000–present)
