= List of storms named Etau =

The name Etau (Palauan: chetau, [ʔə.ˈtaw]) has been used for five tropical cyclones in the Western Pacific Ocean. The name was contributed by the United States and means a "brief squall of thunderstorms" in Palauan.

- Typhoon Etau (2003) (T0310, 11W, Kabayan) – a Category 3-equivalent typhoon that made landfall in Japan.
- Tropical Storm Etau (2009) (T0909, 10W) – affected Japan.
- Tropical Storm Etau (2015) (T1518, 18W) – a severe tropical storm that made landfall in Japan.
- Tropical Storm Etau (2020) (T2021, 24W, Tonyo) – affected the Philippines and Vietnam.
- Tropical Storm Etau (2026) (T2622, 21W) - weak tropical storm that stayed out to sea.

== See also ==
- Hurricane Eta (2020) – a similar name that has been used in the Atlantic Ocean.

Preceded by Atsani	Pacific typhoon season names Etau	Succeeded by Bang-Lang
