= Tropical Storm Morakot (2003) =

Pacific tropical storm in 2003

Tropical Storm Morakot (Juaning)
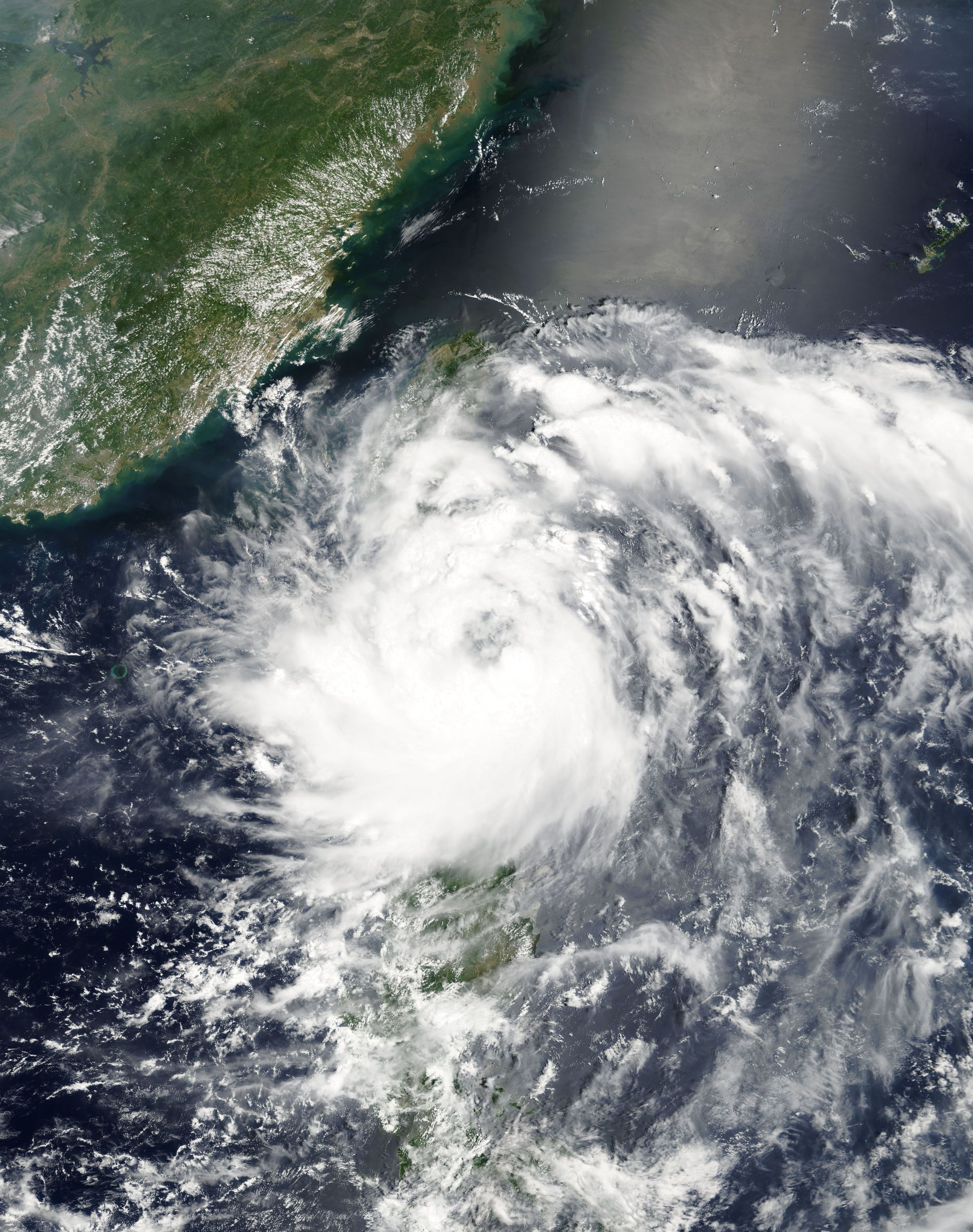
- Tropical Storm Morakot at peak intensity on August 3

Meteorological history
- Formed: July 31, 2003
- Dissipated: August 4, 2003

Tropical storm
- 10-minute sustained (JMA)
- Highest winds: 85 km/h (50 mph)
- Lowest pressure: 992 hPa (mbar); 29.29 inHg

Category 1-equivalent typhoon
- 1-minute sustained (SSHWS/JTWC)
- Highest winds: 120 km/h (75 mph)
- Lowest pressure: 976 hPa (mbar); 28.82 inHg

Overall effects
- Fatalities: 3 total
- Damage: $31 million (2003 USD)
- Areas affected: Taiwan; China
- IBTrACS
- Part of the 2003 Pacific typhoon season

Tropical Storm Morakot, (Note: The name Morakot (Thai: มรกต, [mɔː˧ ra˦˥ kot̚˨˩]) was contributed by Thailand and means emerald in Thai.) known in the Philippines as Tropical Storm Juaning, (Note: The PAGASA assigns names to tropical cyclones that enter their area of responsibility, regardless of its official JMA designation. This name is used locally and for PAGASA tropical cyclone monitoring purposes.) brought significant rainfall to Taiwan before alleviating drought conditions in mainland China in August 2003. The tenth named storm in the western Pacific that year, Morakot spawned from an area of disturbed weather in the Philippine Sea on July 31. Tracking northwest, favorable conditions allowed for the intensification of the system to tropical storm strength on August 2. Morakot reached peak intensity later that day with winds of 85 km/h (50 mph) and a minimum barometric pressure of 992 mbar (hPa; 28.29 inHg). (Note: All sustained wind figures were measured over a period of ten minutes, unless otherwise noted.) This intensity was held for several hours until less conducive atmospheric conditions slightly weakened the system; this was followed by Morakot making landfall on southern Taiwan on August 3. Subsequently, the storm weakened and moved into the Taiwan Strait before making its final landfall near Quanzhou, China the next day. The storm quickly weakened over China, and dissipated entirely several hours after landfall.

In Taiwan, where Morakot first made landfall, heavy rainfall resulted in flooding. Commercial flights, schools, and rail service in some areas were cancelled in advance of the storm. Precipitation there peaked at 653 mm (25.71 in) over a period of nearly two days in Taitung County. Crop damage also resulted from the rainfall, and was estimated at over NT$70 million (US$2 million). (Note: All damage totals are in 2003 United States dollars unless otherwise noted.) In China, record rainfall was reported. The worst impacted city was Quanzhou, where losses due to Morakot reached CN¥240 million (US$29 million) and one death was reported. Power outages were also widespread across southeastern China. Due to preexisting drought conditions, 703 cloud seeding operations took place in order to artificially generate added rainfall; such operations resulted in moderate precipitation over the targeted area. Overall, Morakot caused roughly $31 million in damage and three deaths.

== Meteorological history ==
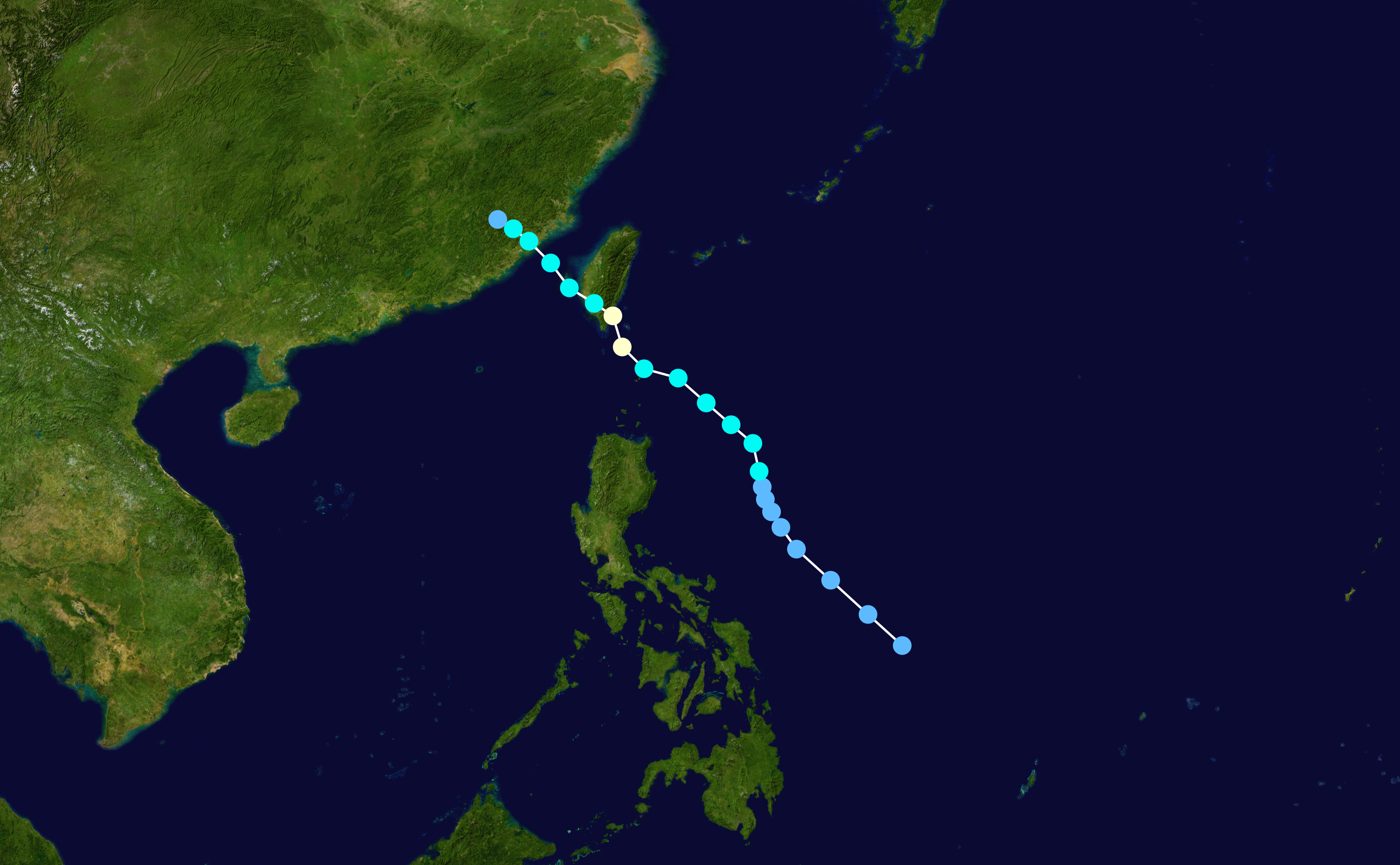
Map plotting the storm's track and intensity, according to the Saffir–Simpson scale Map key Saffir–Simpson scale Tropical depression (≤38 mph, ≤62 km/h) Tropical storm (39–73 mph, 63–118 km/h) Category 1 (74–95 mph, 119–153 km/h) Category 2 (96–110 mph, 154–177 km/h) Category 3 (111–129 mph, 178–208 km/h) Category 4 (130–156 mph, 209–251 km/h) Category 5 (≥157 mph, ≥252 km/h) Unknown Storm type Tropical cyclone Subtropical cyclone Extratropical cyclone, remnant low, tropical disturbance, or monsoon depression

In late July 2003, an area of disturbed weather began to persist northwest of Chuuk in the Philippine Sea, and was first noted by the Joint Typhoon Warning Center (JTWC) early on July 30. As atmospheric conditions remained favorable throughout the day's duration, the system organized, and was upgraded to tropical depression status by the Philippine Atmospheric, Geophysical and Astronomical Services Administration (PAGASA) at 0600 UTC on July 31, followed by the JTWC at 0600 UTC and Japan Meteorological Agency (JMA) six hours later. The PAGASA consequently named the system Juaning for local purposes. Tracking north-northwestward under the influence of a passing trough, the system intensified further into a tropical storm by 0600 UTC on August 2, thus receiving the name Morakot. At the time, the storm was well organized with a steady outflow pattern.

Intensification continued, and at 1800 UTC on August 2 the JMA determined Morakot to have peaked in intensity with winds of 85 km/h (50 mph) and a minimum barometric pressure of 992 mbar (hPa; 28.29 inHg); however, the JTWC still considered Morakot to have been a strengthening tropical cyclone at the time. The appearance of a ragged eye prompted the agency to upgrade the storm to typhoon status at 0600 UTC on August 3, though other agencies still maintained Morakot's tropical storm classification. Over the rest of the day the cyclone moved rather erratically before making its first landfall on Taitung, Taiwan late on August 3. Morakot had slightly weakened prior to landfall and as such estimates from the JMA of the storm's intensity at the time of landfall were slightly lowered to 75 km/h (45 mph). Despite the slowing of the storm's forward motion as it moved across the island, passage over Taiwan was brief and Morakot entered the Taiwan Strait by early on August 4. The cyclone's northwesterly track brought the storm to a second landfall, this time near Quanzhou, China, at approximately 1000 UTC that day. Weakening was quick over China, and by two hours after landfall the JMA declared Morakot to have weakened below tropical depression intensity. The JTWC continued to monitor the system until it was determined to have dissipated by 0000 UTC on August 5.

== Preparations and impact ==
Due to the storm's projected path into Taiwan, the Central Weather Bureau issued a sea and land warning on August 2. Commercial flights between Taiwan and Green and Orchid Islands were cancelled, as well as rail service along Taiwan's eastern coast. Morakot's passage over southern Taiwan resulted in significant rainfall across the island. Precipitation from the tropical cyclone peaked at 653 mm (25.71 in) over nearly two days in Taitung County. The rains uprooted trees in southeastern Taitung City and triggered some landslides. Flash flooding was reported in Pingtung County. Additional landslides blocked highways there, and elementary and junior high schools in the county were forced to close. Power outages also occurred and impacted hundreds of residences. Crop damage ensued from the precipitation, and amounted to over NT$70 million (US$2 million).

Heavy rainfall and flooding also occurred in China. A station in Jinjiang, Fujian recorded 544 mm (21.42 in) of rain in an 18-hour period; this was the most torrential rainfall event for the city since records began. Heavy rains also fell in Zimao Town, where 334 mm (13.15 in) of rain was documented in eight hours. Quanzhou City was heavily impacted by the rainfall, and total losses there reached CN¥240 million (US$29 million). One death resulted in the city. Further south in Heyuan, widespread power outages were caused by torrential rainfall. Winds blew two people off of a high falsework, killing both. The rainfall from Morakot in China somewhat relieved persistent drought conditions in the region. Following the passage of the tropical storm, however, 703 cloud seeding missions were carried out in Fujian Province in order to produce enhanced artificial rainfall. This included the deployment of 1,027 rockets and 14,700 cannonballs containing silver iodide. As a result of these, rainfall totals ranging from 40–60 mm (1.6–2.4 in) over a 138,500 km^{2} (53,500 mi^{2}) area were attributed to anthropologically enhanced precipitation. Though not directly related to Morakot, the storm's cyclonic circulation helped in part to produce thick smog and low visibility conditions in parts of Hong Kong.

== Naming ==
In 2002, the name Hanuman was replaced prior to being used, due to objection by the India Meteorological Department for reason of religion.

== See also ==
- Tropical cyclones in 2003
- Weather of 2003
- Other tropical cyclones named Morakot
- Other tropical cyclones named Juaning
- Typhoon Pabuk (2007)
- Typhoon Lekima (2001)
- Tropical Storm Cimaron (2013)
