= Tropical Storm Etau (2015) =

Pacific tropical storm in 2015

Severe Tropical Storm Etau
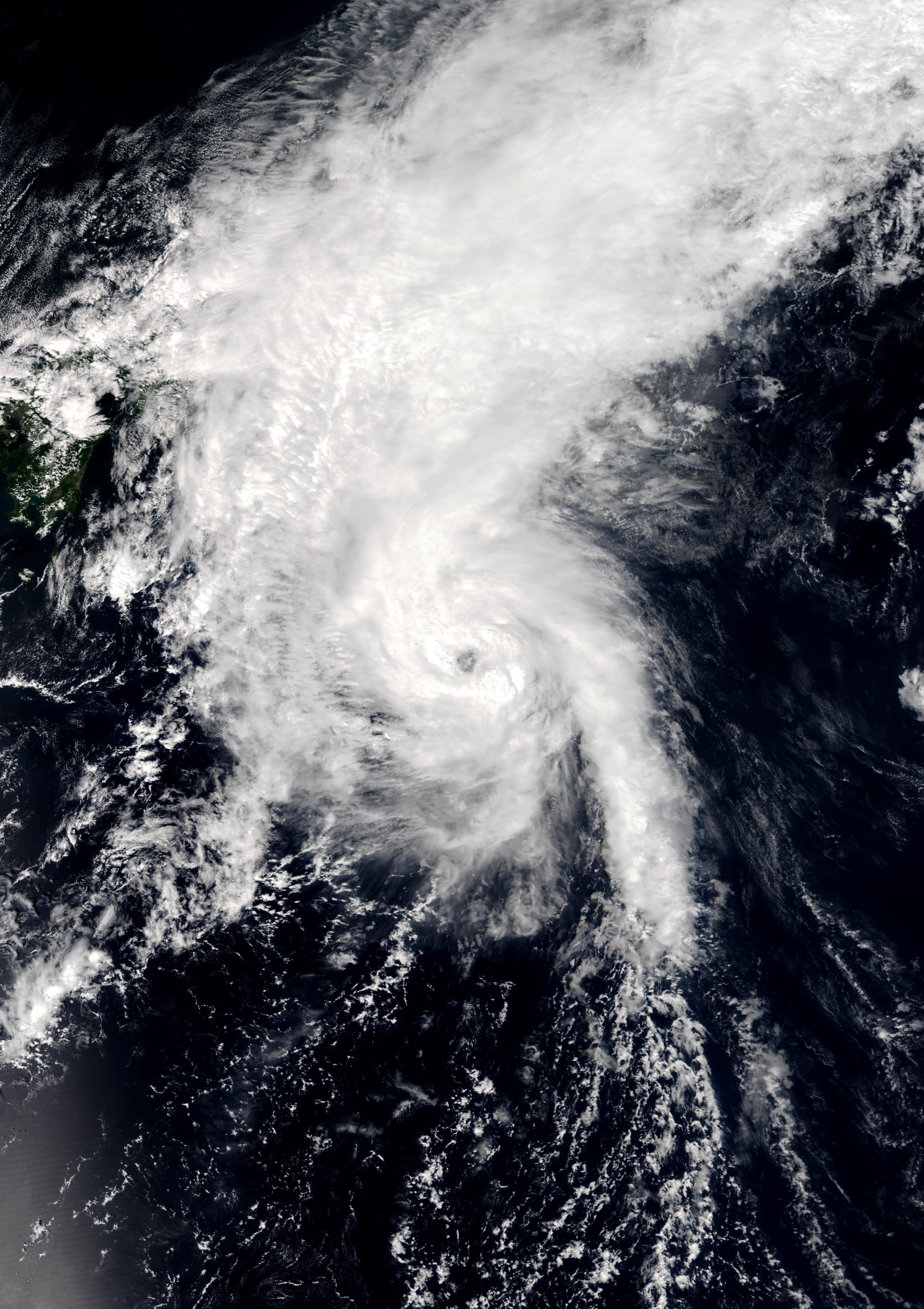
- Etau approaching Japan on September 8

Meteorological history
- Formed: September 6, 2015
- Extratropical: September 9, 2015
- Dissipated: September 11, 2015

Severe tropical storm
- 10-minute sustained (JMA)
- Highest winds: 95 km/h (60 mph)
- Lowest pressure: 985 hPa (mbar); 29.09 inHg

Tropical storm
- 1-minute sustained (SSHWS/JTWC)
- Highest winds: 110 km/h (70 mph)
- Lowest pressure: 978 hPa (mbar); 28.88 inHg

Overall effects
- Fatalities: 8 confirmed
- Damage: $2.44 billion (2015 USD)
- Areas affected: Japan (particularly eastern Honshu), Russian Far East
- IBTrACS
- Part of the 2015 Pacific typhoon season

Severe Tropical Storm Etau (Note: The name Etau (Palauan: chetau, [ʔə.ˈtaw]) was contributed by the United States and means a "brief squall of thunderstorms" in Palauan.) was a potent tropical cyclone that caused extensive and destructive flooding across eastern Japan during early September 2015. Originating from a tropical disturbance near Guam on September 2, Etau was first classified a tropical depression on September 5. Tracking generally north, the cyclone gradually intensified and reached its peak strength with winds of 95 km/h (60 mph) on September 8. The following day, Etau made landfall in Honshu, Japan. It subsequently transitioned into an extratropical cyclone later that day over the Sea of Japan.

Record-breaking rains fell across Ibaraki and Tochigi prefectures, triggering destructive floods. Evacuation orders were issued to approximately 2.8 million people. Levee breaches took place along multiple rivers, most notably the Kinugawa which subsequently inundated the city of Jōsō. Eight people were killed across eastern Japan and total damage amounted to ¥294 billion (US$2.44 billion).

== Meteorological history ==
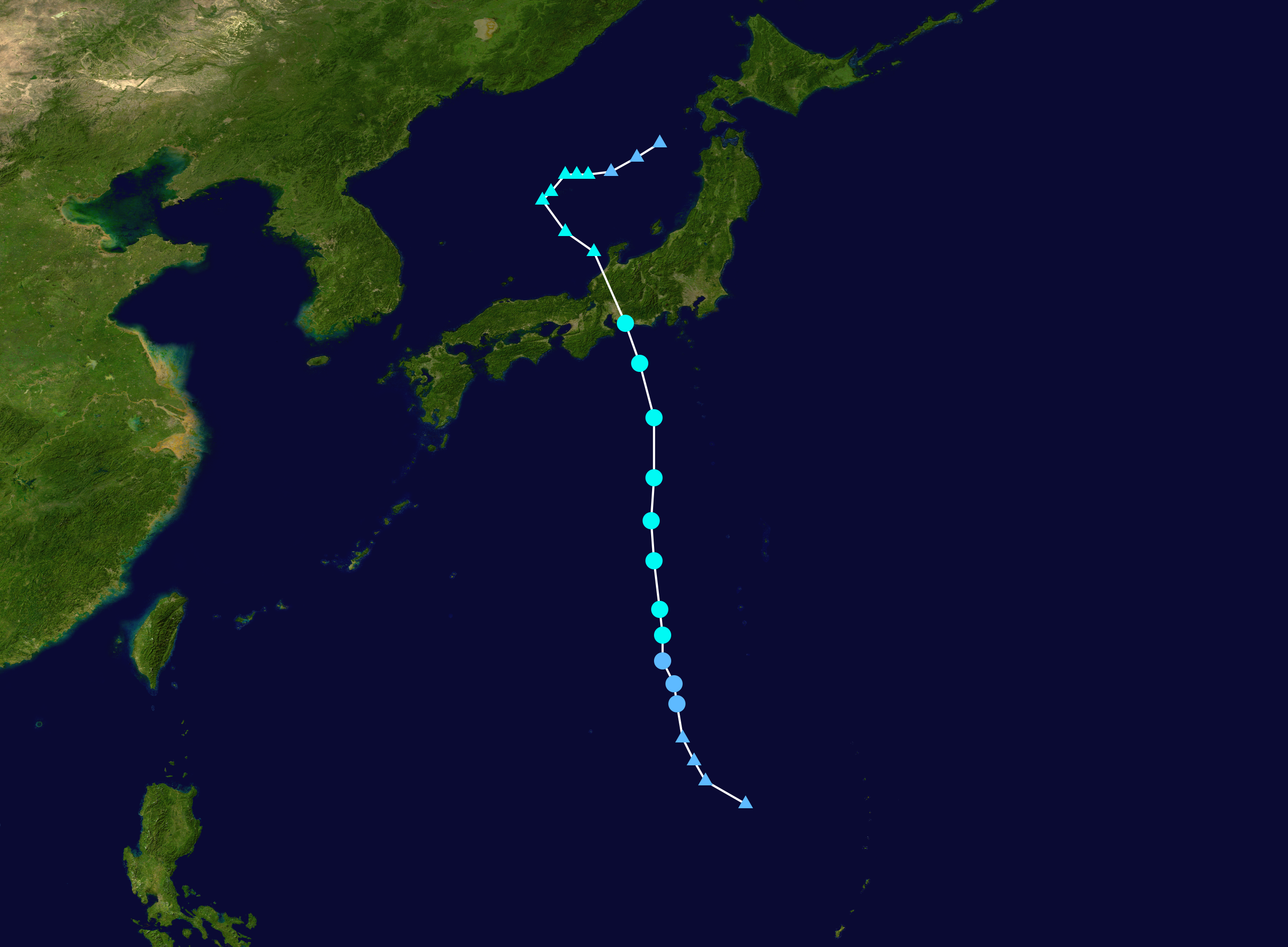
Map plotting the storm's track and intensity, according to the Saffir–Simpson scale Map key Saffir–Simpson scale Tropical depression (≤38 mph, ≤62 km/h) Tropical storm (39–73 mph, 63–118 km/h) Category 1 (74–95 mph, 119–153 km/h) Category 2 (96–110 mph, 154–177 km/h) Category 3 (111–129 mph, 178–208 km/h) Category 4 (130–156 mph, 209–251 km/h) Category 5 (≥157 mph, ≥252 km/h) Unknown Storm type Tropical cyclone Subtropical cyclone Extratropical cyclone, remnant low, tropical disturbance, or monsoon depression

During September 5, the United States Joint Typhoon Warning Center started to monitor a tropical disturbance, that had developed within a marginal environment for further development to the northwest of Guam. At this time the system was broad, weak and unorganized with deep atmospheric convection displaced over the north-western quadrant. Over the next day the disturbance moved north-westwards, as its low level circulation developed further and started to consolidate. During September 6, the system was classified as Tropical Depression 18W by the JTWC and as Tropical Storm Etau by the JMA. However, during Etau's post storm analysis, the JMA announced that the system had only developed into a tropical storm during September 7.

Formative bands wrapped around its ragged and ill-defined LLCC. Satellite image revealed that Etau had convection increasing near its center, therefore, the JTWC upgraded it to a tropical storm. The system later reached its peak intensity as a severe tropical storm on September 8 with maximum sustained winds of 95 km/h (60 mph). Some weakening took place before the system made landfall over Chita Peninsula, Aichi, in the Chūbu region of Japan, early on September 9. Transition into an extratropical cyclone ensued as Etau became embedded within a frontal boundary. This process completed later that day as Etau emerged over the Sea of Japan. The extratropical remnants of Etau later interacted with and was absorbed by another but larger extratropical system which were the remnants of Typhoon Kilo on September 11.

== Impact ==
=== Japan ===
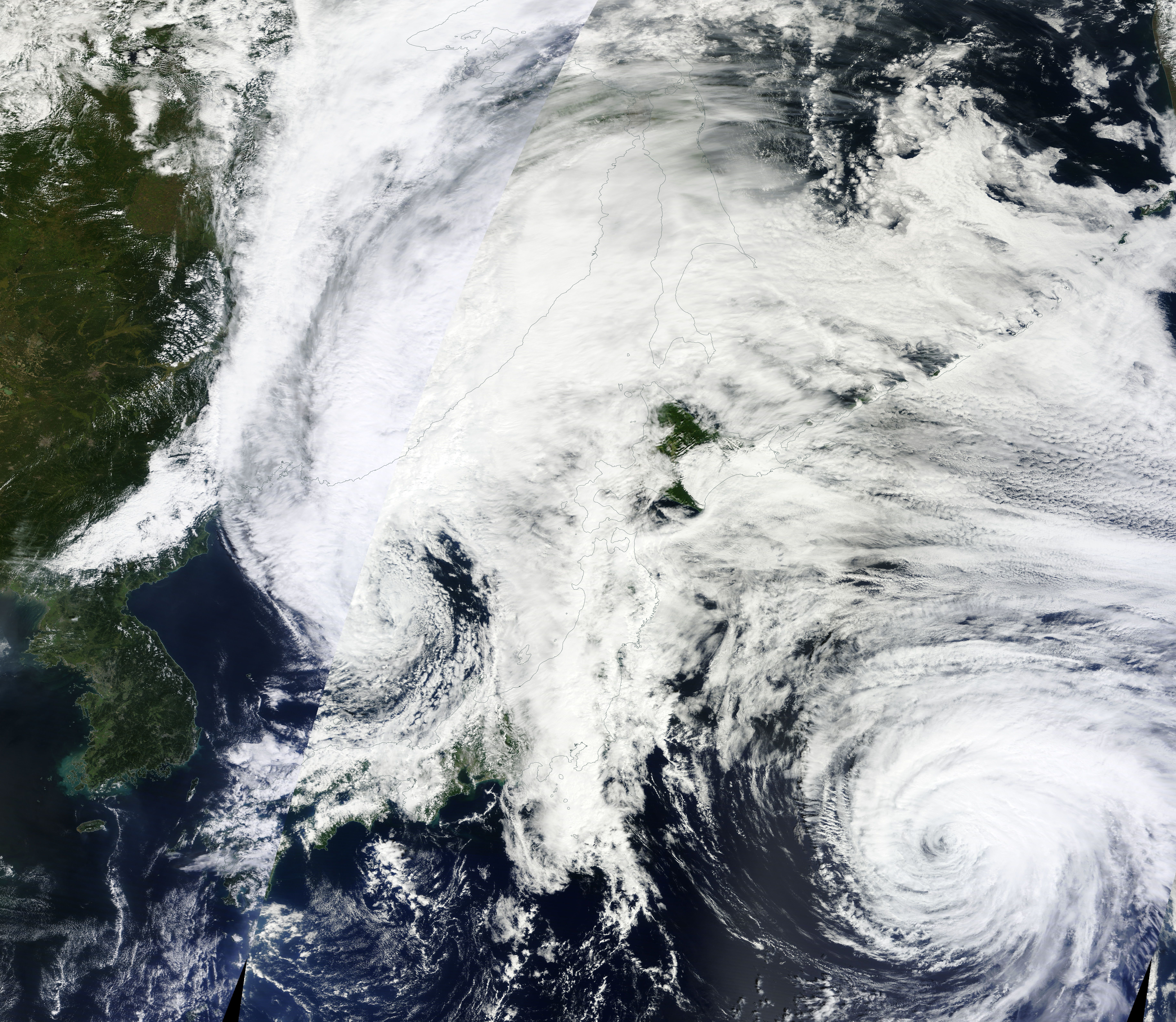
Etau as an extratropical cyclone over the Sea of Japan on September 10 with a frontal boundary extending from the cyclone across eastern Honshu. Severe Tropical Storm Kilo can be seen to the southeast of Ex-Etau.

Record rains fell across many areas in eastern Japan, with more than 12 in (300 mm) reported in much of eastern Honshu. The JMA director, Takuya Deshimaru, called the event "unprecedented". The heaviest rains fell across Tochigi Prefecture where 668 mm (26.3 in) was observed in Nikkō, including 551 mm (21.7 in) in 24 hours. Kanuma saw 444 mm (17.5 in) during 24 hours, more than double its previous record. Farther north in Sendai, 350 mm (14 in) of rain was observed. Toba, Mie saw 75.5 mm (2.97 in) in an hour. Fukushima Prefecture saw its heaviest rains in 50 years, with more than 300 mm (12 in) observed during a 48‑hour span.

The extreme rains prompted multiple emergency warnings from the JMA and Takuya Deshimaru stated that the situation posed "grave danger" to residents. An emergency rainfall warning was issued for Tochigi and Ibaraki prefectures on September 10 and for Miyagi Prefecture on September 11. More than 90,000 people were placed under mandatory evacuation orders A further 700,000 people were advised to evacuate as of the morning of September 11, including 410,000 in Sendai, Miyagi. At the height of the storm, 600,000 people were advised to relocate across Kawasaki in Kanagawa Prefecture. Overall, approximately 2.8 million people were advised to evacuate, with 183,500 people under mandatory orders.

The heavy rains triggered widespread flooding, with multiple rivers over-topping their banks. A 140 m (460 ft) section of a levee along the Kinugawa River in Ibaraki collapsed shortly after noon local time on September 10, inundating the nearby city of Jōsō. An evacuation order was not issued for Jōsō until the levee was already breached; Mayor Toru Takasugi later issued a public apology for the delayed warning. This was the first time the river broke its banks in 66 years. A 40 km^{2} (15 mi^{2}) area with an estimated 6,500 homes and businesses was affected. Residents were left stranded on rooftops, with 880 still in need of rescue by the morning of September 11. Two people died in the city. Two other areas along the river, including Chikusei, experienced flooding. Throughout Ibaraki Prefecture, 3,089 hectares (7,633 acre) of crops were damaged with losses exceeding ¥920 million (US$7.64 million). One person died in Sakai.

External videos
- Levee breach along the Kinugawa River viewed by aerial drone YouTube video

At least one person was killed by a landslide in Kanuma, Tochigi. Another landslide at a mine in Ashikaga killed a worker. A third death in Tochigi occurred due to flooding. Widespread flooding affected Miyagi Prefecture, especially around the town of Taiwa. A levee along the Shibui River in Ōsaki was breached, stranding 1,000 people. Two people drowned across the prefecture. A total of 4,533 hectares (11,201 acres) of farmland were submerged. Landslides and flooding in Chiba Prefecture affected 109 buildings and rendered numerous roads impassible. Significant damage took place at a fishing port in Chōshi; multiple vessels sank and driftwood cluttered the water. Agricultural losses in the prefecture reached ¥84 million (US$698,000).

Drainage pumps at the crippled Fukushima Daiichi Nuclear Power Plant, which suffered critical meltdowns after the 2011 Tōhoku earthquake and tsunami, were overwhelmed on September 9 and allowed contaminated water to flow into the Pacific Ocean. This was the seventh such incident in 2015. Flood waters swept 293 bags of radioactive waste into a nearby river, 171 of which were retrieved by September 13. More than 800 people were isolated in the mountain town of Minamiaizu after the Tateiwagawa River washed away the only highway access to the town.

Damage across the Tōkai region, where Etau made landfall, was comparably light. A total of 108 homes were affected and landslides damaged multiple roads. Losses in the region reached ¥265 million (US$2.2 million). An 800-year-old tree in Tarui, Gifu, a local natural monument, was felled from a combination of saturated soil and high winds produced by Etau.

=== Russia ===
The extratropical remnants of Etau brought moderate rains to Primorsky Krai in the Russian Far East on September 10. Accumulations peaked at 73 mm (2.9 in) with values over 50 mm (2.0 in) limited to coastal areas. Winds up to 79 km/h (49 mph) were observed in Vladivostok.

== Aftermath ==
The Japan Self-Defense Forces dispatched helicopters to Jōsō soon after the floods, rescuing people from rooftops. More than 6,000 personnel and 51 helicopters were deployed. Rescuers were reportedly overwhelmed by the number of calls for help. A rescue attempt of a couple in Jōsō was aired live; however, the structure they were standing on collapsed and the feed was cut and their fate is currently unknown. The Metropolitan Police Department in Tokyo planned to send 100 officers to Jōsō while members of the Tokyo Fire Department were deployed with a helicopter. Lingering high waters from the levee breach hampered relief efforts. Prime Minister Shinzō Abe toured Jōsō on September 12. By September 13, approximately 2,100 people from Jōsō remained in public shelters. The Japanese Red Cross provided ¥3 million (US$25,000) to relief efforts and asked the public for donations.

== See also ==
- Weather of 2015
- Tropical cyclones in 2015
- Other tropical cyclones named Etau
- Typhoon Man-yi (2013)
- Typhoon Mindulle (2016)
- Tropical Storm Nanmadol (2017)
