= Tropical Storm Etau (2009) =

Pacific tropical storm in 2009

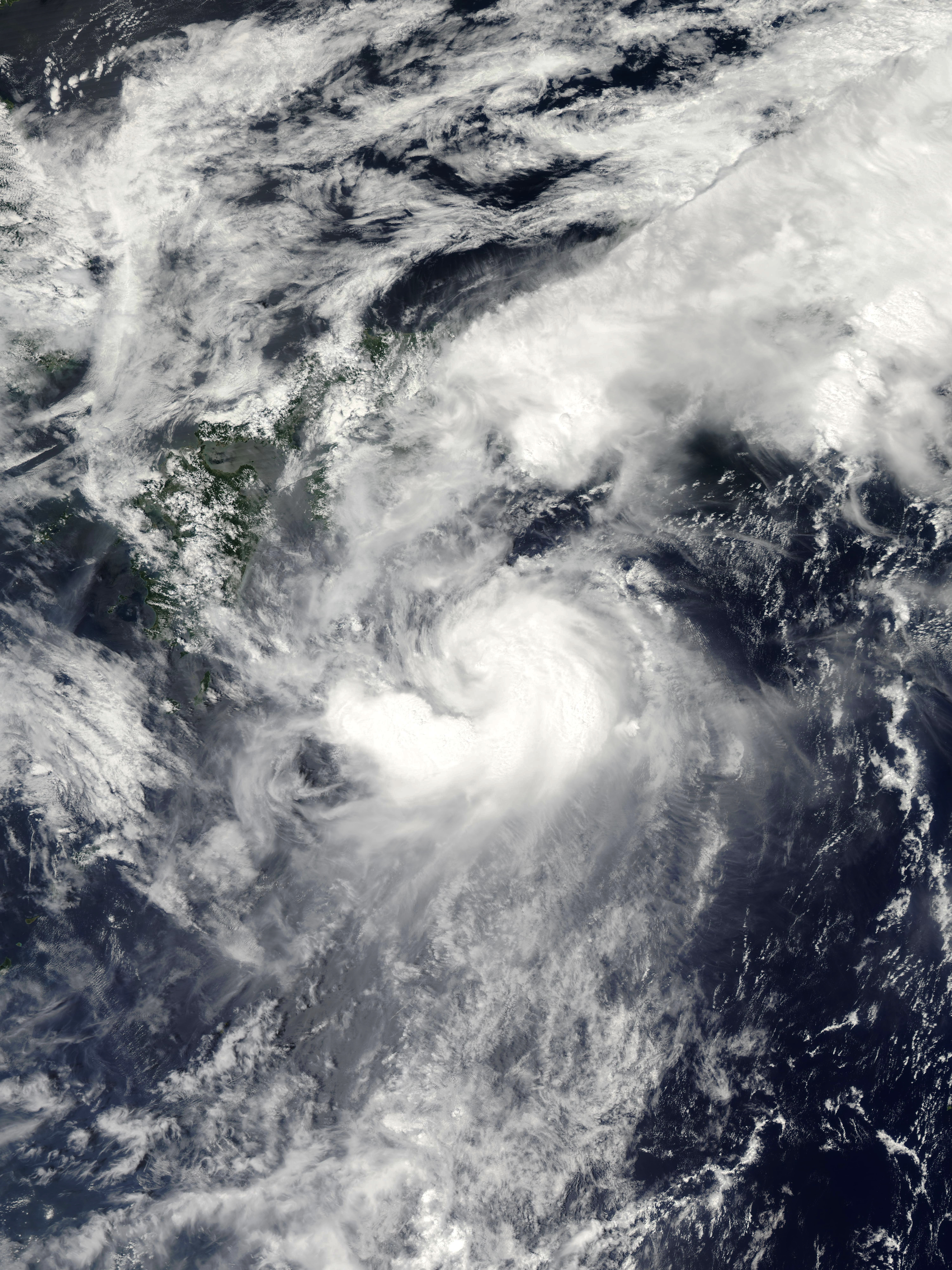
- Tropical Storm Etau at peak intensity on August 10

Meteorological history
- Formed: August 8, 2009
- Extratropical: August 14, 2009
- Dissipated: August 16, 2009

Tropical storm
- 10-minute sustained (JMA)
- Highest winds: 75 km/h (45 mph)
- Lowest pressure: 992 hPa (mbar); 29.29 inHg

Tropical storm
- 1-minute sustained (SSHWS/JTWC)
- Highest winds: 75 km/h (45 mph)
- Lowest pressure: 992 hPa (mbar); 29.29 inHg

Overall effects
- Fatalities: 28 total
- Damage: $1.44 billion (2009 USD)
- Areas affected: Japan (particularly Hyōgo Prefecture)
- IBTrACS
- Part of the 2009 Pacific typhoon season

Tropical Storm Etau (Note: The name Etau (Palauan: chetau, [ʔə.ˈtaw]) was contributed by the United States and means a "brief squall of thunderstorms" in Palauan.) was the deadliest tropical cyclone to impact Japan since Typhoon Tokage in 2004. Forming on August 8, 2009 from an area of low pressure, the system gradually intensified into a tropical storm. Tracking in a curved path around the edge of a subtropical ridge, Etau continued to intensify as it neared Japan. By August 10, the cyclone reached its peak intensity as a weak tropical storm with winds of 75 km/h (45 mph 10-minute sustained) and a barometric pressure of 992 hPa (mbar). Shortly after, Etau began to weaken. Increasing wind shear led to the center becoming devoid of convection and the system eventually weakened to a tropical depression on August 13. The remnants of Etau persisted for nearly three days before dissipating early on August 16.

Although Etau did not make landfall, the outer bands of the storm produced torrential rainfall in Japan, peaking at 326.5 mm (12.85 in). These rains triggered deadly flooding and mudslides, especially in Hyōgo Prefecture. Twenty-eight people were killed by the storm and ¥140 billion (US$1.44 billion) in damage occurred throughout the affected region. According to the Fire and Disaster Management Agency, a total of 5,602 homes were flooded and 183 were destroyed. Following the storm, 600 Japanese soldiers were deployed from Tokyo to assist in cleanup efforts.

== Meteorological history ==
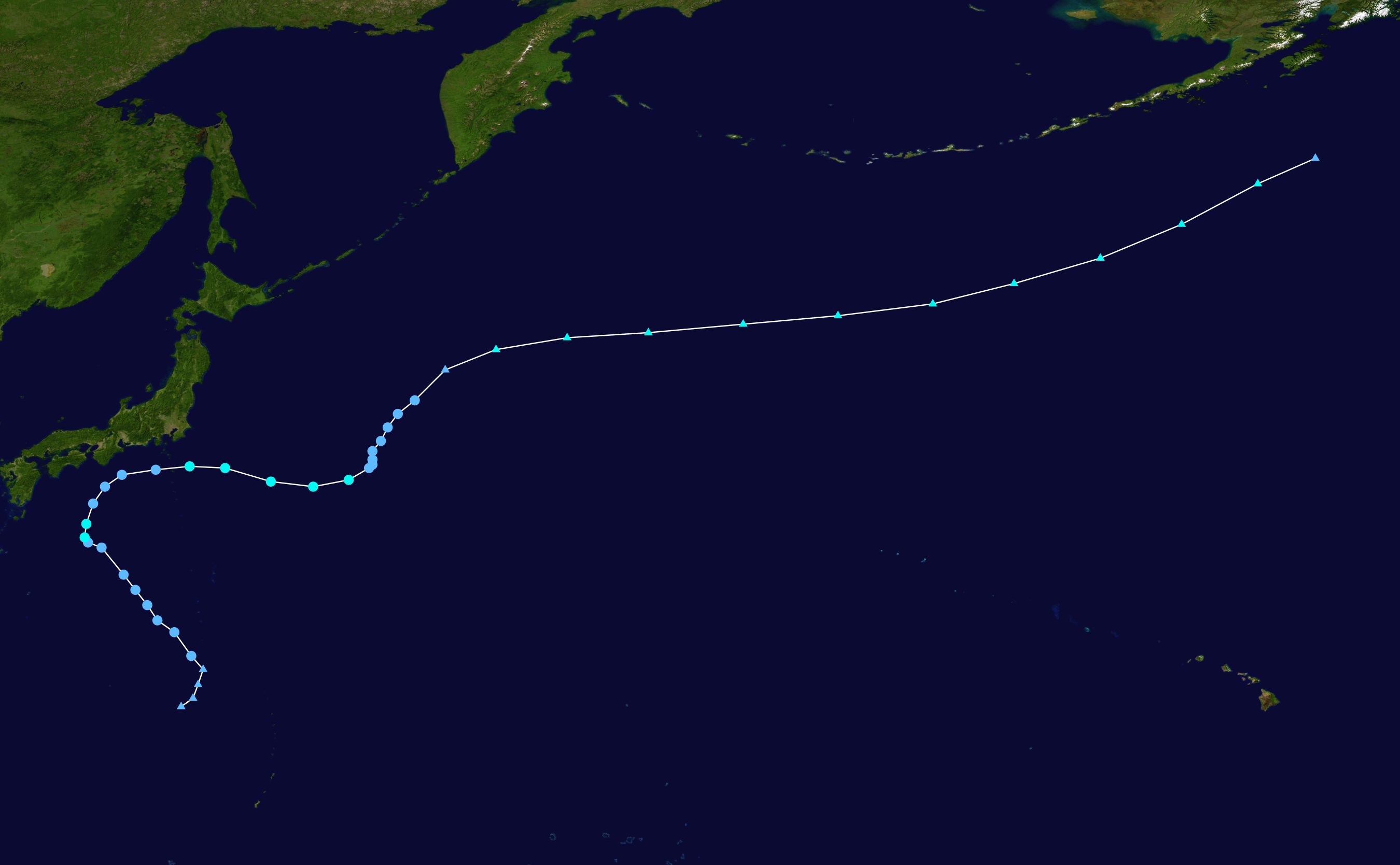
Map plotting the storm's track and intensity, according to the Saffir–Simpson scale Map key Saffir–Simpson scale Tropical depression (≤38 mph, ≤62 km/h) Tropical storm (39–73 mph, 63–118 km/h) Category 1 (74–95 mph, 119–153 km/h) Category 2 (96–110 mph, 154–177 km/h) Category 3 (111–129 mph, 178–208 km/h) Category 4 (130–156 mph, 209–251 km/h) Category 5 (≥157 mph, ≥252 km/h) Unknown Storm type Tropical cyclone Subtropical cyclone Extratropical cyclone, remnant low, tropical disturbance, or monsoon depression

Tropical Storm Etau originated on August 5 out of an area of low pressure associated with disorganized convective activity located about 550 km (280 mi) east-northeast of Guam. The following day, the system relocated several dozen kilometers to the north. Convective turning began to appear on satellite imagery and a tropical upper tropospheric trough (TUTT) cell to the north provided a northward component to the system's movement. Early on August 7, the Joint Typhoon Warning Center (JTWC) issued a Tropical Cyclone Formation Alert for the developing system as deep convection consolidated around the low-pressure system. Around 0000 UTC on August 8, the Japan Meteorological Agency (JMA) designated the system as a tropical depression.

Several hours later on August 8, the JTWC also declared the system a tropical depression, classifying it at 10W. Later that day, convection associated with the depression became disorganized, preventing intensification of the system. The depression generally tracked towards the northwest during the day in response a subtropical ridge to the north. By August 9, the center of circulation became more defined as convection wrapped around it. Around 1200 UTC, the JMA upgraded the depression to a tropical storm and gave it the name Etau. The JTWC, however, did not upgrade the system to a tropical storm for several more hours. On August 10, the JTWC briefly downgraded the storm to a tropical depression. By this time, the system had re-curved to the east around the western periphery of the subtropical ridge. Etau also became slightly disorganized as it began to interact with the baroclinic zone near Japan. Early on August 11, the JMA reported that the storm winds had peaked at 75 km/h (45 mph 10-minute sustained) and a barometric pressure of 992 hPa (mbar). Later that day, the storm once more became slightly disorganized due to increased wind shear; however, the JTWC reported that the storm intensified based on satellite intensity estimates and weather radar imagery from Japan.

Later on August 11, the center of Etau became partially devoid of convection, with only a narrow band of shower and thunderstorm activity persisting to the southeast of the center. Increasing wind shear prevented convection from redeveloping and the storm continued to weaken. Early the following day, the JTWC issued their final advisory on Etau as they reported it had weakened to a tropical depression well to the east of Japan. Roughly 24 hours later, the JMA also downgraded the system to a tropical depression. The final advisory on Etau was issued by the JMA early on August 14 as it slowly tracked northward.

== Preparations, impact and aftermath ==
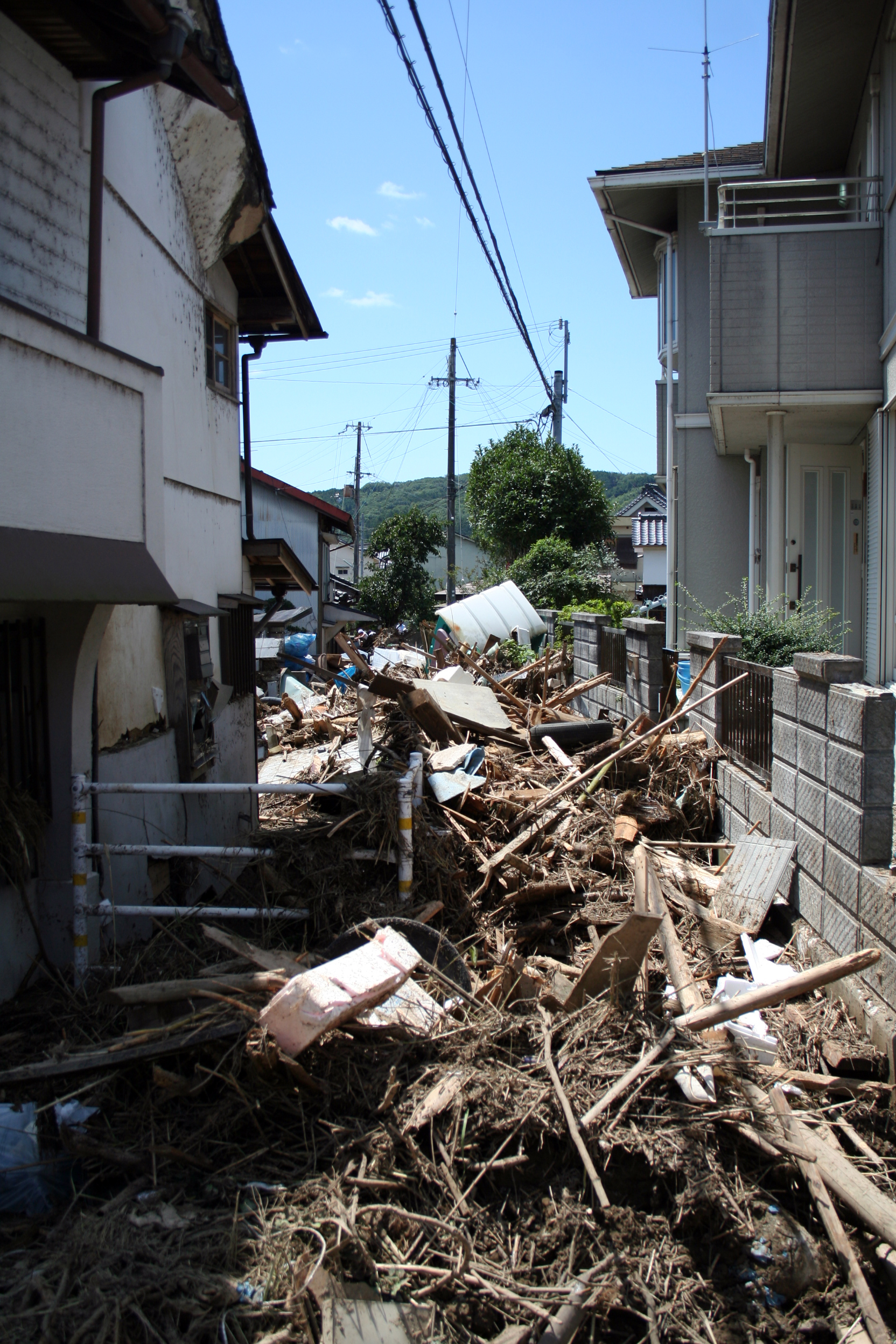
Debris filled street in Sayo after flood waters receded

In anticipation of wind gusts up to 126 km/h (78 mph) and heavy rains, Japanese officials evacuated roughly 47,000 residents from western regions along the coast as gale warnings were declared by the JMA. Officials also feared that flooding from Tropical Storm Etau would mirror that of Typhoon Morakot in Taiwan where at least 14 were killed in the country's worst flood in 50 years. Six flights in the country were canceled after a plane was struck by lightning. Fifteen railway services were also canceled due to heavy rains. According to officials in Japan, nearly 140,000 people were evacuated to shelters in relation to flooding and landslides produced by Etau.

As Tropical Storm Etau brushed Japan on August 10, torrential rains fell within its outer bands. In a 24‑hour span, a record 326.5 mm (12.85 in) of rain fell, triggering extensive flooding and landslides. Initial reports stated that 13 people were killed and 10 others were missing due to the storm. Most of the fatalities took place in Hyōgo Prefecture where hundreds of homes were flooded and numerous others were damaged or destroyed by landslides. In some areas, flood waters reached a depth of 1.5 m (4.9 ft). One man drowned after driving his car into a flooded street and being overcome by the water. Another person was killed after her home was destroyed by a landslide in Okayama prefecture.

In Tokushima, two people were listed as missing and two others sustained serious injuries. Later news reports stated that up to 18 people were missing following further landslides. The affected region was especially susceptible to landslides due to recent seismic activity, with a magnitude 6.4 earthquake taking place on August 10. By August 11, one of the missing persons was confirmed to have been killed during the storm. About 800 people were placed in public shelters and 53,000 homes were left without running water. By August 12, a total of 18 people were confirmed to have been killed and nine others were still missing. Three bridges in Tokushima were also washed away. Days later, the Japanese Fire and Disaster Management Agency finalized the death toll at 26 with one other missing, making Etau the deadliest tropical cyclone to impact Hyōgo Prefecture, Japan since Typhoon Tokage in 2004. Throughout several prefectures, 5,602 homes were flooded and 183 were destroyed. Landslides triggered by the storm damaged another 2,109 structures, most of which were in Okayama and Hyōgo prefectures. Following severe damages, in the town of Sayo it requested assistance from the national government. As a result, more than 200 troops were deployed to the town. Total damage caused by the storm was ¥140 billion (US$1.44 billion). A post-disaster office was also set up by the prime minister's office crisis management center. An additional 400 troops were deployed to the city by August 11 to assist in rescue efforts.

== See also ==
- Weather of 2009
- Tropical cyclones in 2009
- Other tropical cyclones named Etau
- Tropical Storm Nanmadol (2017)
