= List of storms named Morakot =

The name Morakot (Thai: มรกต, pronounced [mɔ̄ː.rā.kòt]) was used for two tropical cyclones in the West Pacific Ocean. The name, contributed by Thailand, means emerald in Thai. (Note: The name Hanuman (Thai: หนุมาน, pronounced [hà(ʔ).nú(ʔ).māːn]), referring to the Hindu deity Hanuman, was originally slated for use. However, Hanuman was replaced by Morakot at the request of the India Meteorological Department due to the former's religious significance.)

- Tropical Storm Morakot (2003) (T0309, 10W, Juaning) – struck Taiwan and China.
- Typhoon Morakot (2009) (T0908, 09W, Kiko) – a very large, deadly typhoon that struck Taiwan and China, also triggered heavy flooding in the Philippines. More than 700 people were killed.

The name Morakot was retired after the 2009 season and replaced with Atsani.

== See also ==
- Cyclone Mora (2017) – a North Indian Ocean tropical cyclone with a similar name.
