= List of storms named Atsani =

The name Atsani (Thai: อัสนี, pronounced [ʔàt.sā.nīː]) has been used for three tropical cyclones in the western North Pacific Ocean. The name was contributed by Thailand and means thunderbolt in Thai. It replaced the Morakot after it being retired following the 2009 Pacific typhoon season.

- Typhoon Atsani (2015) (T1516, 17W), a Category 5 super typhoon that remained in the open ocean
- Severe Tropical Storm Atsani (2020) (T2020, 23W, Siony), brushed the northern Philippines and dissipated near Taiwan
- Tropical Storm Atsani (2026) (T2621, 19W), weak tropical storm that remained in the open ocean

Preceded by Gaenari	Pacific typhoon season names Atsani	Succeeded by Etau

== See also ==
- Cyclone Asani (2022) – a similar name that was used in the North Indian Ocean.
