= 2003 Pacific typhoon season =

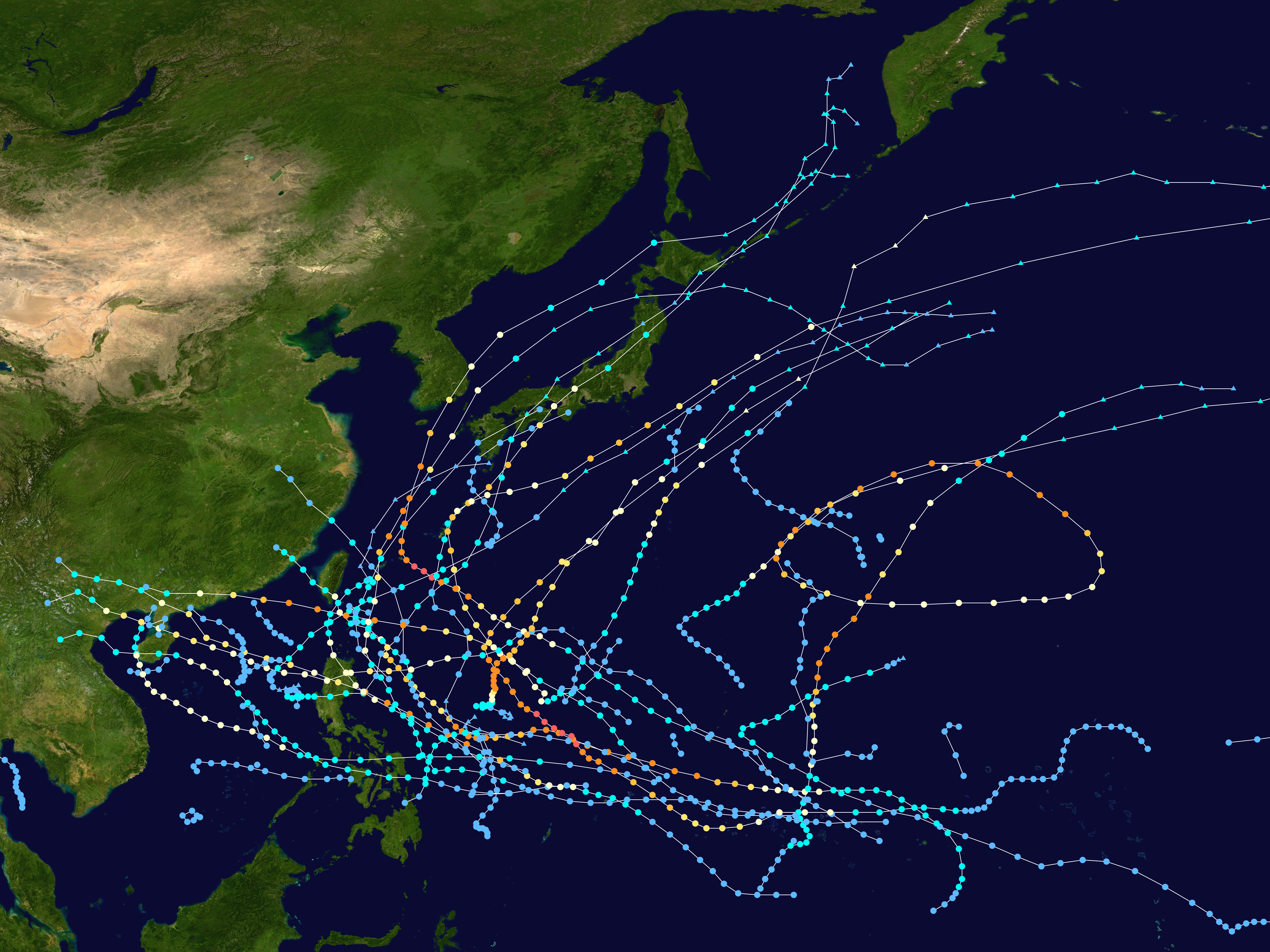
- Season summary map

Seasonal boundaries
- First system formed: January 15, 2003
- Last system dissipated: December 27, 2003

Strongest storm
- Name: Maemi
  - Maximum winds: 195 km/h (120 mph) (10-minute sustained)
  - Lowest pressure: 910 hPa (mbar)

Seasonal statistics
- Total depressions: 45
- Total storms: 21
- Typhoons: 14
- Very strong typhoons: 8
- Violent typhoons: 1
- ACE: 335.9
- Total fatalities: 351 total
- Total damage: $7 billion (2003 USD)

Related articles
- 2003 Atlantic hurricane season; 2003 Pacific hurricane season; 2003 North Indian Ocean cyclone season

The 2003 Pacific typhoon season was a below-average annual cycle of tropical cyclogenesis in the northwestern Pacific Ocean, exhibiting the development of 45 tropical depressions, of which 21 became named storms; of those, 14 became typhoons. Though every month with the exception of February and March featured tropical activity, most storms developed from May through November. During the season, tropical cyclones affected the Philippines, Japan, China, the Korean Peninsula, Indochina, and various islands in the western Pacific.

The season ran year-round, with the first storm, Yanyan, developing west of the Marshall Islands on January 15. In April, Typhoon Kujira became one of the longest-lasting Pacific typhoons in history and attained climatological records for its unusually early impacts. Typhoon Imbudo in July killed 85 people when it struck the Philippines and China. It was followed soon after by Tropical Storm Koni, which hit the same countries as well as Vietnam. August was a highly active month for tropical cyclogenesis, with five named storms. In September, Typhoon Maemi became the strongest tropical cyclone of the season, with a minimum barometric pressure of 910 mbar (hPa; 26.87 inHg). Maemi later struck South Korea, becoming one of the country's costliest typhoons after causing US$4.8 billion in damage. (Note: All monetary totals are in their respective 2003 values, and were converted to United States dollars via the Oanda Corporation website.) In October, two typhoons – Ketsana and Parma – existed simultaneously while staying away from land In late November, Typhoon Lupit devastated areas of Yap State in the Federated States of Micronesia. The season closed with the dissipation of a tropical depression east of the Philippines on December 27.

The scope of this article is limited to the Pacific Ocean, north of the equator and west of the International Date Line. Storms that form east of the date line and north of the equator are called hurricanes; see 2003 Pacific hurricane season. Tropical storms formed in the entire northwest Pacific basin are assigned a name by the Tokyo Typhoon Center. Tropical depressions in this basin monitored by the Joint Typhoon Warning Center (JTWC) (Note: The Joint Typhoon Warning Center is a joint United States Navy–United States Air Force task force that issues tropical cyclone warnings for the western Pacific Ocean and other regions.) have the "W" suffix added to their number. Tropical depressions that enter or form in the Philippine area of responsibility are assigned a name by the Philippine Atmospheric, Geophysical and Astronomical Services Administration (PAGASA). This can often result in the same storm having two names.

== Seasonal forecasts ==
| TSR forecasts Date | Tropical storms | Total Typhoons | Ref |
|---|---|---|---|
| Average (1972–2001) | 26.1 | 16.3 | |
| March 5, 2003 | 26.2 | 16.6 | |
| April 11, 2003 | 26.7 | 17.1 | |
| May 6, 2003 | 26.0 | 16.3 | |
| June 10, 2003 | 25.8 | 16.1 | |
| July 4, 2003 | 26.3 | 16.7 | |
| August 5, 2003 | 27.0 | 17.5 | |
Actual activity
| Forecast Center | Tropical storms | Typhoons | Ref |
| JMA | 21 | 14 | |
| JTWC | 23 | 17 | |
| PAGASA | 21 | 14 | |

On March 5, 2003, meteorologists from the University College London at the Tropical Storm Risk (TSR) Consortium issued a forecast for the typhoon season, noting the likelihood of near average tropical cyclone activity as a result of projected neutral sea surface temperatures. The forecast indicated the potential for 26.2 tropical storms, compared to the 10– and 30-year average of 27.8 and 26.3 storms, respectively. The following month, the group raised their forecast for tropical storms to 26.7, indicating a slightly above average season. Over next two months, however, fluctuations in sea surface temperatures, particularly those in the Central Pacific, caused the group to revise their predictions downward and indicated the probability for a slightly below average typhoon season in their June forecast. A rise in sea surface temperatures in the following months prompted the forecasting group to once again raise their forecasts to indicate a near-average season in their final August forecast update, which predicted 27 tropical storms. The group was very accurate in their forecasts, with their April and August forecasts being the most accurate.

Similarly, meteorologists working with the City University of Hong Kong issued a seasonal projection on April 24, 2003, indicating the likelihood of a normal or below normal season with 29 total tropical cyclones, 26 tropical storms, and 16 typhoons. As with the TSR, the group primarily based their forecast numbers on the prevailing status of the El Niño-Southern Oscillation. The City University of Hong Kong revised their forecasts on June 24, 2003, indicating a slight increase of total tropical cyclones to 30. The group was also accurate in their forecasts for the entirety of the Northwest Pacific, though their specialized forecasts for the South China Sea were substantially off.

During the year, the Japan Meteorological Agency (JMA) issued advisories on tropical cyclones west of the International Date Line to the Malay Peninsula, and north of the equator; this was due to the agency's status as the official Regional Specialized Meteorological Center, as designated by the World Meteorological Organization in 1989. The JMA issued forecasts and analyses four times a day, beginning at 00:00 UTC (Note: All times are in Coordinated Universal Time. For reference, UTC+07:00 includes Thailand, UTC+08:00 includes China; UTC+09:00 includes Japan. UTC+10:00 includes the Marianas Islands.) and continuing every six hours. The JMA issued forecasts based on a climatological tropical cyclone forecast model. The agency estimated 10 minute sustained winds and barometric pressure based on the Dvorak technique and numerical weather prediction. The JTWC also issued warnings on storms within the basin, operating from Pearl Harbor in Hawaii to represent the interests of the United States Armed Forces in the Indian and Pacific Oceans.

== Season summary ==
The Accumulated Cyclone Energy (ACE) index for the 2003 Pacific typhoon season as calculated by Colorado State University using data from the Joint Typhoon Warning Center was 337.4 units. Throughout the season, sea surface temperatures within the western equatorial Pacific were above normal, including those in the South China Sea. Areas of convection persisted year-round in the lower latitudes, particularly around the Philippines. Atmospheric divergence was also prevalent in the same regions, resulting in enhanced tropical cyclogenesis east of the Philippines in 2003; the mean region of development of tropical systems during the year was more southwest than the 1971–2000 30-year average. In 2003, the JMA monitored 21 tropical cyclones of at least tropical storm intensity; of those, 14 reached typhoon intensity. Though the number of tropical storms was below average, the ratio between tropical storms and typhoons was 66% greater than normal. The Philippine Atmospheric, Geophysical and Astronomical Services Administration (PAGASA) monitored one tropical depression and one tropical storm that were not monitored by the JMA.

== Systems ==
=== Tropical Storm Yanyan ===
- Tropical storm (JMA)
- Tropical storm (SSHWS)
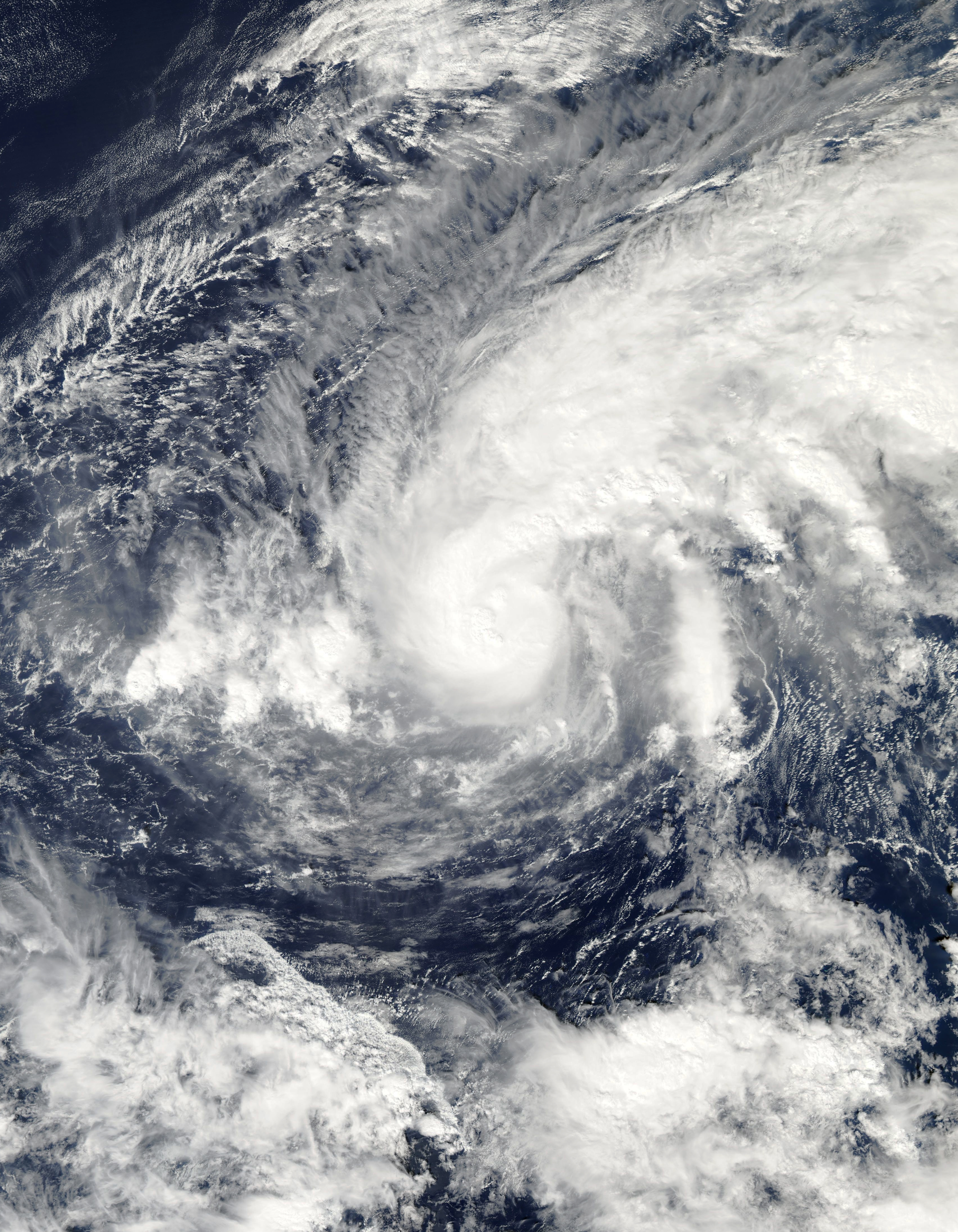
- Duration: January 15 – January 20
- Peak intensity: 65 km/h (40 mph) (10-min); 1000 hPa (mbar)

On January 11, a tropical disturbance originated near the International Date Line. Steered by a subtropical ridge to its north, the system tracked westward and developed into a tropical depression on January 15, west of the Marshall Islands. The convection, or thunderstorms, waxed and waned. The JMA upgraded the depression to Tropical Storm Yanyan on January 18, stimating peak 10 minute winds of 65 km/h (40 mph). The JTWC estimated 1 minute winds of 95 km/h (60 mph). Around that time, the storm stalled east of the Mariana Islands and curved sharply northeastward into a less favorable environment. The JMA downgraded Yanyan to tropical depression status on January 20, before reclassifying the system as extratropical cyclone. Strong wind shear decoupled the low-level circulation center from the convection. On January 21, both the JTWC and JMA discontinued the monitoring of Yanyan.

=== Typhoon Kujira (Amang) ===
- Very strong typhoon (JMA)
- Category 4 super typhoon (SSHWS)
- Duration: April 9 – April 25
- Peak intensity: 165 km/h (105 mph) (10-min); 930 hPa (mbar)

A tropical depression formed on April 9, which moved westward. It strengthened into Tropical Storm Kujira on Apil 11, which attained typhoon status three days later. Late on April 15, Kujira reached its peak intensity with winds of 165 km/h (103 mph) and a minimum barometric pressure of 930 mbar (hPa; 27.46 inHg). Afterward, the typhoon's intensity fluctuated as it passed east of the Philippines and Taiwan, with eventual weakening as it turned to the north. On April 24, Kujira was downgraded to tropical depression strength as it made landfall on Kyushu. Afterward, Kujira transitioned into an extratropical cyclone on April 25, which persisted until crossing the International Dateline.

Shortly after developing, Kujira caused two fatalities in Pohnpei in addition to minor agricultural and infrastructural damage; similar effects were felt in Guam. Kujira was the first typhoon since 1978 to prompt typhoon warnings in Taiwan. It brought significant rainfall to the island. Effects from the typhoon were most significant in Japan, particularly in the Ryukyu Islands. Strong winds, rain, and waves caused US$230,000 (¥27.8 million) in agricultural damage on Ishigaki Island. One person was killed due to injuries resulting from the waves. In Kyushu, heavy rainfall, peaking at 196 mm (7.7 in) in Ōita Prefecture, was reported.

=== Typhoon Chan-hom ===
- Very strong typhoon (JMA)
- Category 4 typhoon (SSHWS)
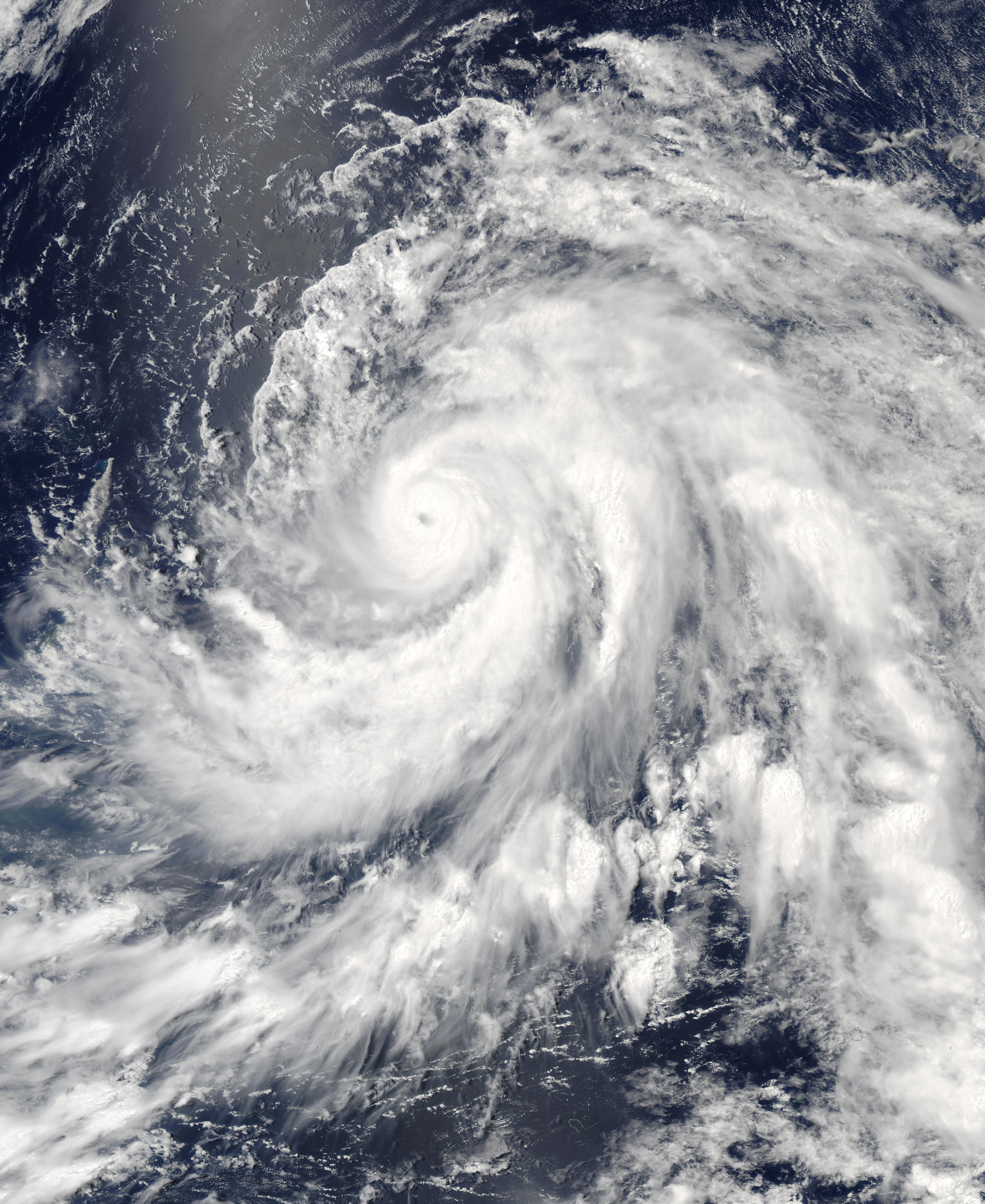
- Duration: May 19 – May 27
- Peak intensity: 155 km/h (100 mph) (10-min); 940 hPa (mbar)

A tropical depression formed on May 19 to the southwest of Chuuk. A day later, it strengthened into Tropical Storm Chan-hom while moving generally to the north, steered by a shortwave trough. On May 23, Chan-hom attained typhoon status, as it developed an eye. That day, Chan-hom reached peak winds of 155 km/h (96 mph) and a minimum pressure of 940 millibars (940 hPa; 28 inHg). Chan-hom began to intake dry air beginning on May 25, resulting in weakening as it accelerated to the northeast. Increased wind shear striped convection from the center. Early on May 27, Chan-hom transitioned into an extratropical cyclone, which dissipated south of the Aleutian Islands the following day.

As a tropical storm, Chan-hom caused some damage to homes and crops on Chuuk, mostly due to heavy rains brought forth by the storm. Offshore, a 1,040 ton fishing vessel, the Nien Feioch, sank during the storm. The ship was valued at $16 million. Winds from the typhoon fanned volcanic ash from the recently erupting Anatahan volcano towards Guam, prompting precautionary measures. Ashfalls were reported on the island, forcing the cancellation of several flights.

=== Severe Tropical Storm Linfa (Chedeng) ===
- Severe tropical storm (JMA)
- Tropical storm (SSHWS)
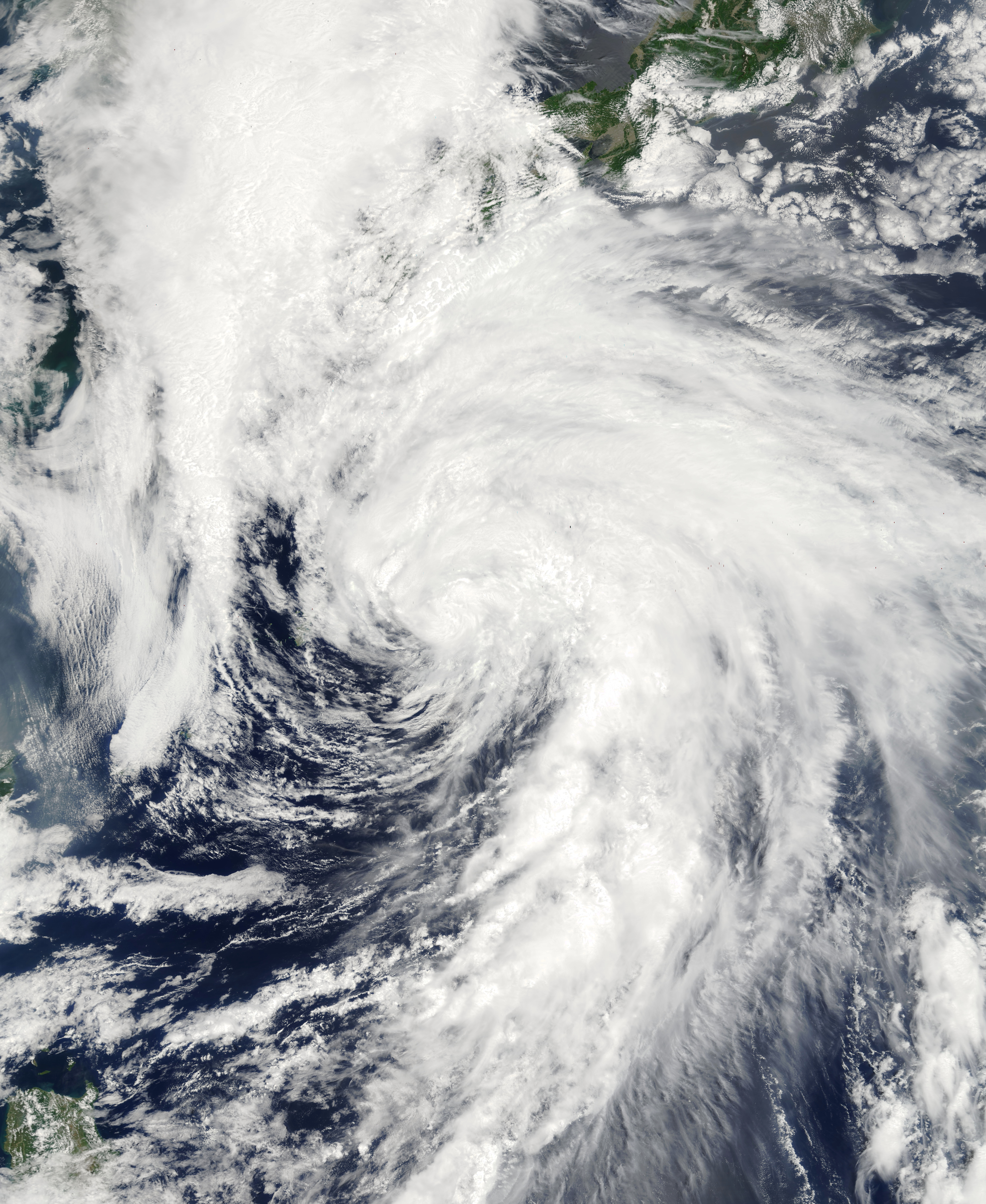
- Duration: May 25 – May 30
- Peak intensity: 100 km/h (65 mph) (10-min); 980 hPa (mbar)

A tropical depression formed off the western coast of Luzon on May 25, quickly strengthening into Tropical Storm Linfa. The storm executed a small clockwise loop before hitting Luzon on May 27. Linfa weakened over land before restrengthening over open waters. It reached its peak intensity on May 29 with maximum sustained winds of 100 km/h (62 mph) and a barometric pressure of 980 mbar (hPa; 28.94 inHg). Linfa transitioned into an extratropical cyclone on May 30, which moved through Japan and later dissipated in the Sea of Okhotsk on June 4.

The erratic and slow movement of Linfa off the western Philippines was the catalyst for extreme rainfall and flooding, killing 41 persons in the archipelago. Precipitation peaked at 723 mm (28.5 in) near Dagupan. Rising floodwaters resulted in the temporary shutdown of government offices and numerous mudslides. In addition, strong winds caused widespread power outages. Overall damage from Linfa in the Philippines amounted to ₱192.3 million (US$3.65 million). The floods also displaced 8,367 people in 1,686 families and destroyed 178 homes. Linfa and its extratropical remnants later brought torrential rainfall and widespread flooding to Japan, particularly in southwestern regions. Rainfall there peaked at 727 mm (28.6 in). Flood damage was worst in Kōchi and Tokushima Prefectures, where several buildings were destroyed by floodwater. Other locations in Japan experienced considerable agricultural damage as well as numerous landslides. Overall, Linfa caused roughly $28.2 million in damage, much of which occurred in Japan, though the entirety of deaths associated with the cyclone took place in the Philippines.

=== Severe Tropical Storm Nangka (Dodong) ===
- Severe tropical storm (JMA)
- Tropical storm (SSHWS)
- Duration: May 30 – June 3
- Peak intensity: 95 km/h (60 mph) (10-min); 985 hPa (mbar)

In late May, an area of disturbed weather began to persist in the South China Sea. The JTWC began to monitor the storm cluster on May 29. The following day, the JMA reclassified the system as a tropical depression; initially the system remained highly disorganized due to the lack of deep convection. Persistent moderate wind shear and dry air prevented the cyclone from strengthening significantly in the storm's early stages. These conditions abated as the depression tracked northeast. On June 1, the JMA upgraded the system to Tropical Storm Nangka. Throughout the course of the day, Nangka continued to strengthen as it accelerated northeast, and peaked in strength with a barometric pressure of 985 mbar (985 hPa; 29.1 inHg) and maximum sustained winds of 95 km/h (59 mph), making it a severe tropical storm. However, upon moving through the Bashi Channel, conditions began to deteriorate due to increased wind shear. It weakened to tropical depression status on June 3. Nangka continued to become increasingly disorganized as it moved further north, and late that day, the depression transitioned to an extratropical cyclone. The resulting remnants continued to track well east of Japan before dissipating on June 7. Due to its track away from landmasses, damage remained minimal; however, as Nangka passed to the south and east of Japan, the storm brought light rainfall to the country, peaking at 81 mm (3.2 in) in Minamidaitō, Okinawa.

=== Typhoon Soudelor (Egay) ===
- Typhoon (JMA)
- Category 4 typhoon (SSHWS)
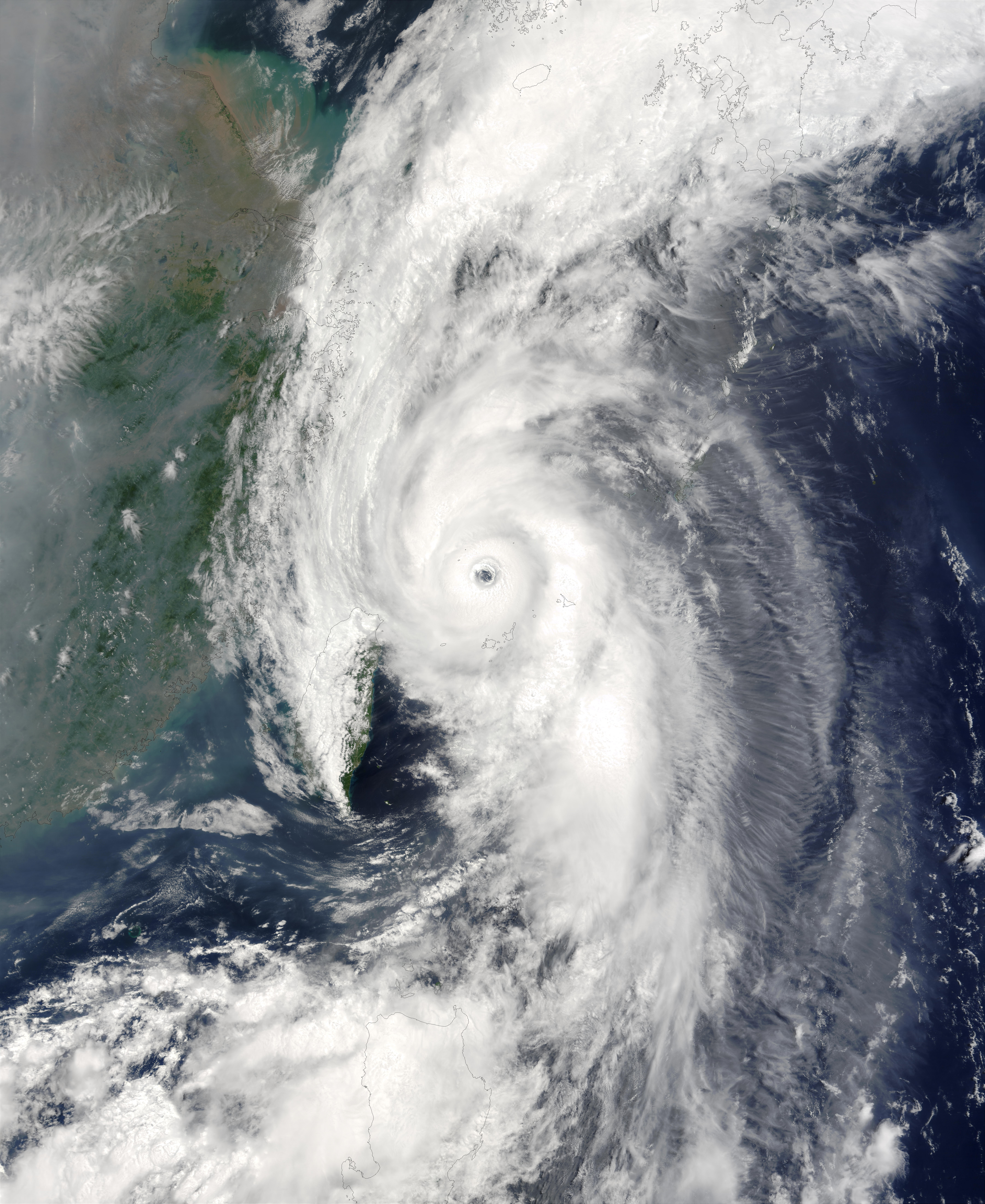
- Duration: June 12 – June 19
- Peak intensity: 150 km/h (90 mph) (10-min); 955 hPa (mbar)

A tropical depression formed northeast of Palau on June 12. On June 13, the JMA upgraded it to Tropical Storm Soudelor to the east of the Philippines, and PAGASA gave it the local name "Egay". The storm moved to the northwest and later to the north, parallel to the eastern Philippines, and on June 17, the JMA upgraded it to typhoon status. That day, Soudelor passed over the Japanese island of Iriomote-jima. On June 18, the JTWC estimated peak 1 minute winds of 215 km/h (134 mph), while the JMA estimated peak 10 minute winds of 150 km/h (93 mph). On June 19, Soudelor weakened and became extratropical near the Oki Islands. The remnants crossed northern Japan on June 20 and dissipaed four days later.

While offshore the Philippines, Soudelor dropped heavy rainfall that caused flooding and left thousands homeless. The storm caused ₱131 million (PHP, US$2.46 million) in damage and 12 deaths. On the Japanese island of Iriomote-jima, wind gusts reached 204 km/h (127 mph). It also affected Taiwan, where floods covered highways and caused mudslides. In Japan, the storm caused widespread power outages, although damage was minimal, and there were 21 injuries. In South Korea, there was $12.1 million in damage and two deaths.

=== Typhoon Imbudo (Harurot) ===
- Very strong typhoon (JMA)
- Category 4 super typhoon (SSHWS)
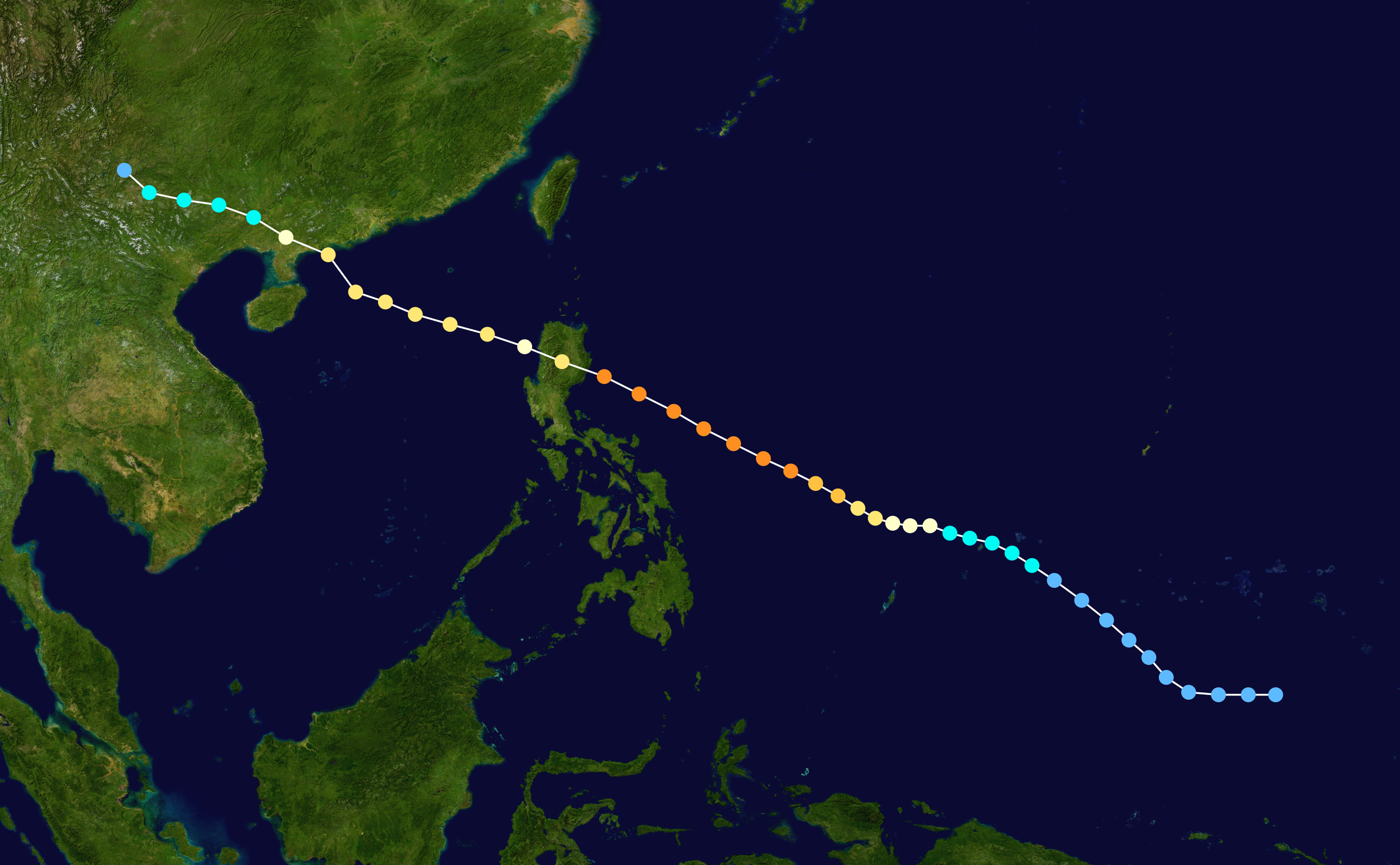
- Duration: July 15 – July 25
- Peak intensity: 165 km/h (105 mph) (10-min); 935 hPa (mbar)

On July 15, the JMA estimated that a tropical depression formed, and the next day the JTWC initiated advisories on Tropical Depression 09W about 665 km (413 mi) east of Yap. A subtropical ridge near Okinawa steered the nascent depression to the west-northwest for much of its duration. With warm waters and favorable upper-level conditions, the depression quickly organized, first to Tropical Storm Imbudo on July 17, and to typhoon status two days later, when PAGASA begin issuing advisories on Typhoon Harurot. Around that time, Imbudo was rapidly intensifying, developing a well-defined eye. On July 20, the JMA estimated peak 10 minute sustained winds of 165 km/h (103 mph), and the same time, the JTWC estimated 1 minute sustained winds of 240 km/h (150 mph), making it a super typhoon. Imbudo maintained peak winds for about 12 hours, before undergoing an eyewall replacement cycle. Early on July 22, Imbudo struck northern Luzon, with 1 minute winds estimated at 205 km/h (127 mph) by the JTWC. It weakened over land, but re-intensified in the South China Sea, striking southern China near Yangjiang, Guangdong on July 24. Imbudo rapidly weakened, dissipating on July 25.

In the Philippines, officials evacuated over 14,000 people. Imbudo was the strongest typhoon to strike since Typhoon Zeb five years prior, The typhoon left widespread areas flooded for several days. Damage was heaviest in the Cagayan Valley, where over 80,000 people were displaced by the storm. In Isabela, high winds wrecked most of the banana crop and severely damaged other crops. Throughout the Philippines, Imbudo damaged or destroyed 62,314 houses, causing P4.7 billion (2003 PHP, $86 million 2003 USD) in damage. There were 64 deaths in the country. In southern China in Yangjiang, more than 30,000 people evacuated ahead of the storm, and more than half of the trees in the city fell due to strong winds. High winds killed a man in Hong Kong after knocking him off a platform. Throughout Guangdong, Imbudo destroyed 595,000 houses and caused eight deaths. Heavy rains spread across southern China, peaking at 343 mm (13.5 in) at Hepu County in Guangxi province. There, 12 people died from the storm. Overall damage in China was about ¥4.45 billion (CNY, $297 million USD).

=== Severe Tropical Storm Koni (Gilas) ===
- Severe tropical storm (JMA)
- Category 1 typhoon (SSHWS)
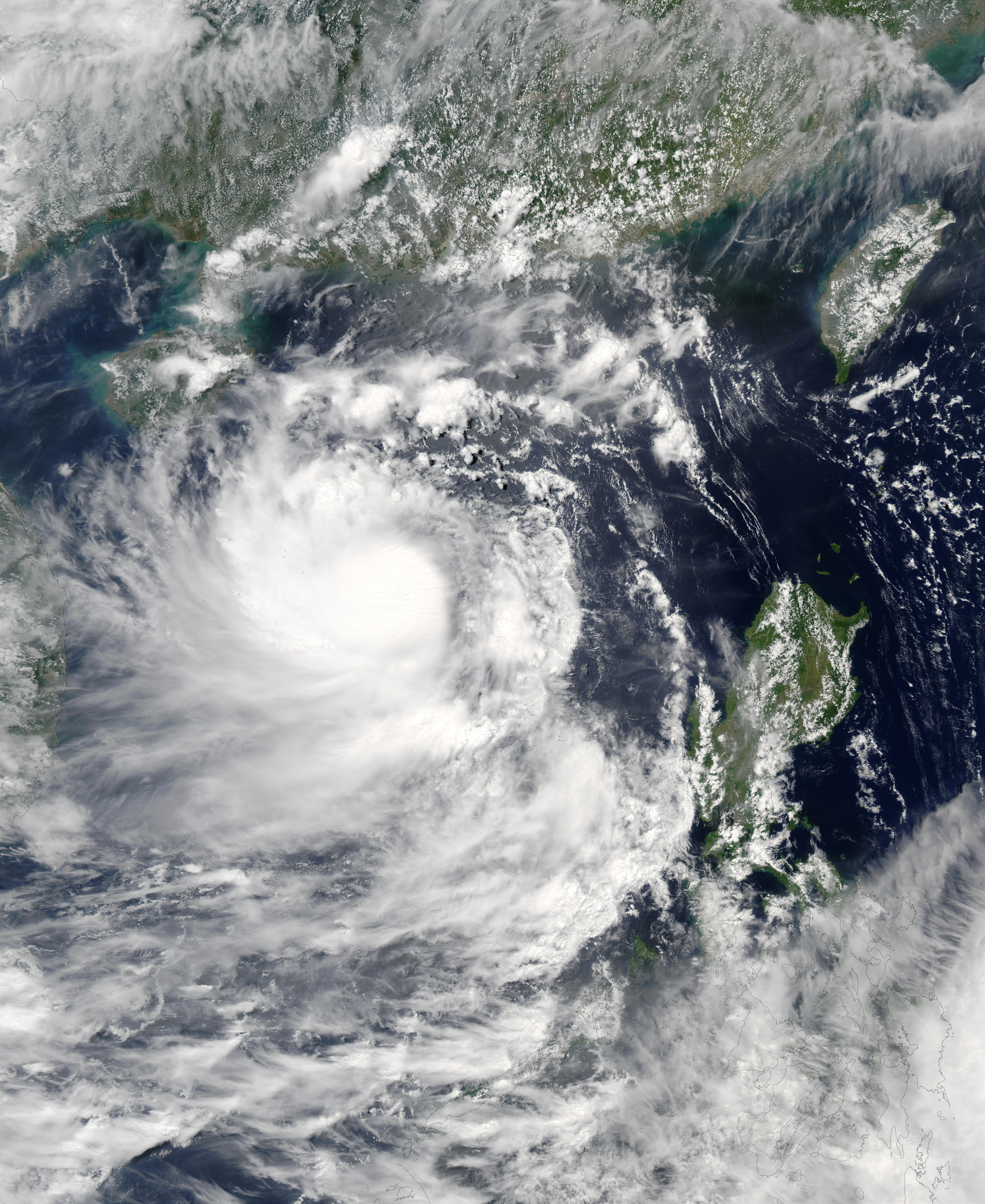
- Duration: July 15 – July 23
- Peak intensity: 110 km/h (70 mph) (10-min); 975 hPa (mbar)

A tropical depression formed the east of the Philippines on July 15 within the monsoon trough. It moved across the central Philippines as a tropical depression on July 17. Soon after moving into the South China Sea, the cyclone reached tropical storm status on July 18. A day later, Koni reached peak intensity with maximum sustained winds of 110 km/h (68 mph), making it a severe tropical storm. However, atmospheric conditions began to deteriorate as Koni made landfall on Hainan on July 21, weakening the system. Koni weakened further as it moved over the Gulf of Tonkin, prior to a final landfall near Hanoi, Vietnam the following day. Tracking inland, Koni dissipates over Laos on July 23.

Shortly after development, Koni tracked through the Philippines, killing two people. After moving into the South China Sea, turbulence produced by the storm resulted in an aviation incident involving a commercial airliner off the western Philippines. Three of the plane's occupants received minor injuries. In Hainan, Koni caused heavy rainfall, peaking at 189 mm (7.4 in) at a station on Wuzhi Mountain. The rains resulted in the collapse of 1,400 homes and an estimated CN¥140.27 million (US$16.9 million) in direct economic losses. Effects were worst in Vietnam, where three people were killed. Widespread power outages occurred, and strong winds resulted in agricultural and infrastructural damage, particularly in Vietnam's northern provinces.

=== Tropical Storm Morakot (Juaning) ===
- Tropical storm (JMA)
- Category 1 typhoon (SSHWS)
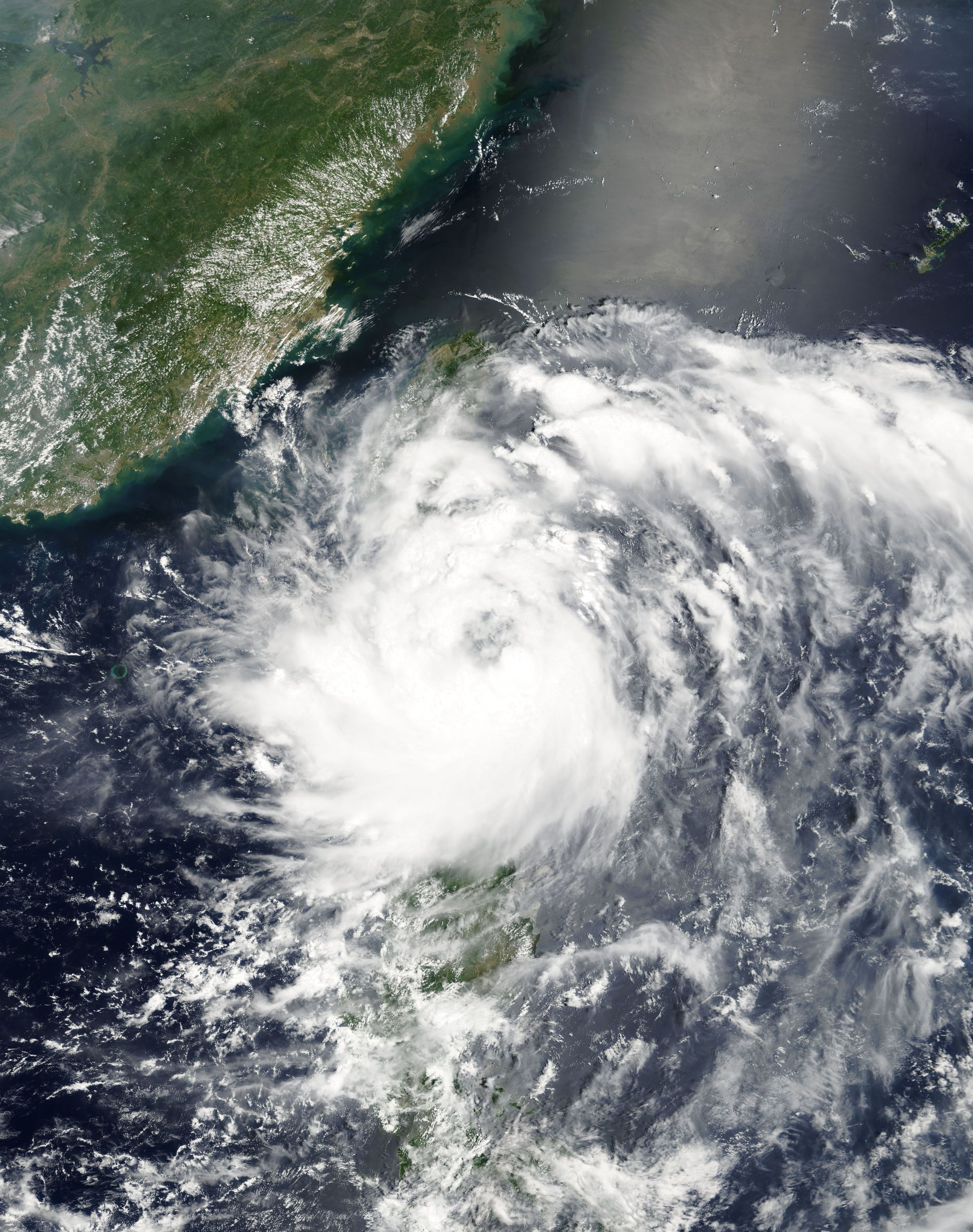
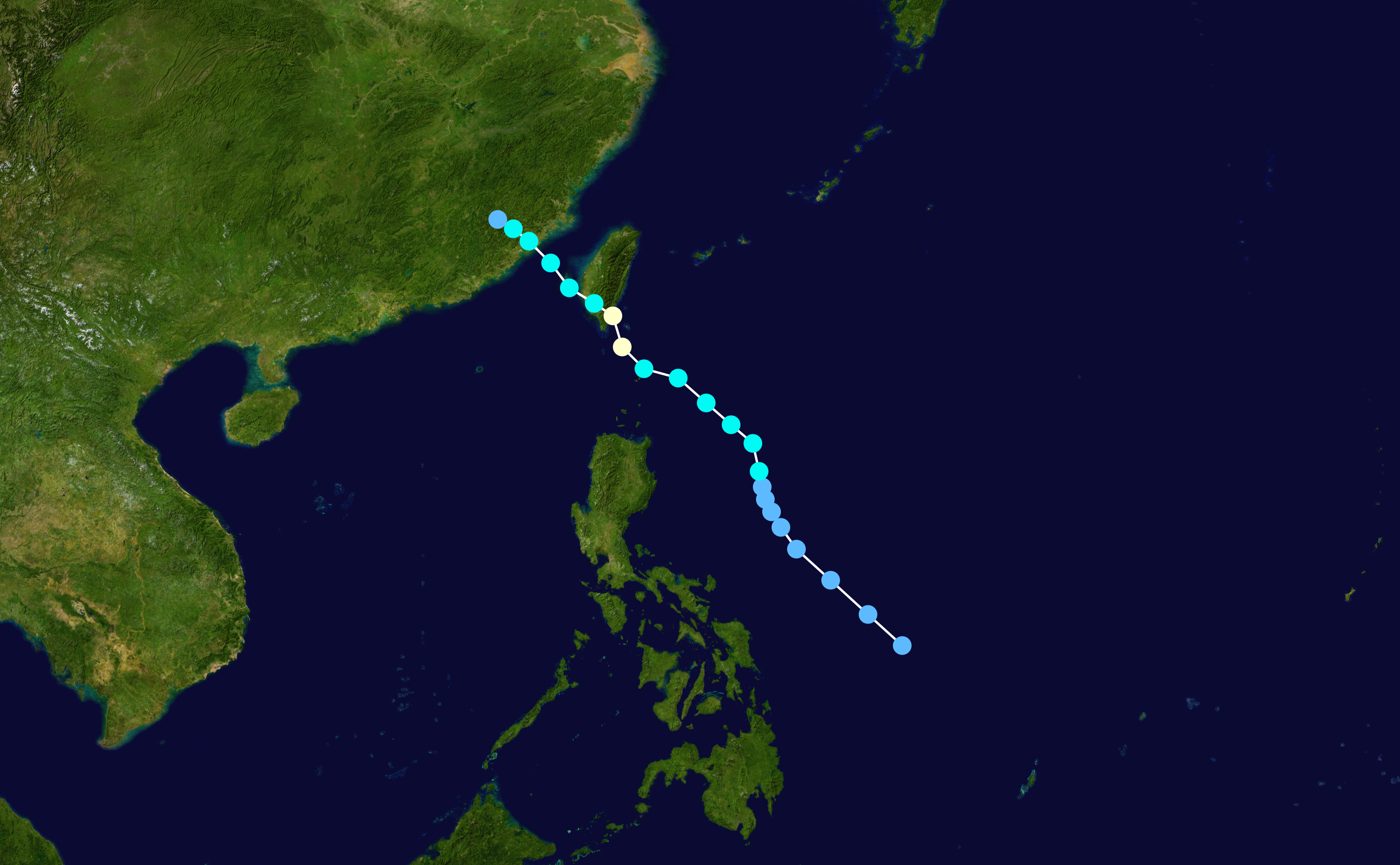
- Duration: July 31 – August 4
- Peak intensity: 85 km/h (50 mph) (10-min); 992 hPa (mbar)

Morakot spawned from an area of disturbed weather in the Philippine Sea on July 31. Tracking northwest, favorable conditions allowed for the intensification of the system to tropical storm strength on August 2. Morakot reached peak intensity later that day with winds of 85 km/h (53 mph) and a minimum barometric pressure of 992 mbar (hPa; 28.29 inHg). Morakot made landfall on southern Taiwan on August 3. Subsequently, the storm weakened and moved into the Taiwan Strait before making its final landfall near Quanzhou, China the next day. The storm quickly weakened over the Chinese mainland, and dissipated entirely several hours after landfall.

In Taiwan, where Morakot first made landfall, heavy rainfall resulted in flooding. Commercial flights, schools, and rail service in some areas was cancelled in advance of the storm. Precipitation there peaked at 653 mm (25.7 in) over a period of nearly two days in Taitung County. Crop damage also resulted from the rainfall, and was estimated at over NT$70 million (US$2 million). In China, record rainfall was reported. The worst impacted city was Quanzhou, where losses due to Morakot reached CN¥240 million (US$29 million) and one death was reported. Power outages were also widespread across southeastern China. Due to preexisting drought conditions, 703 cloud seeding operations took place in order to artificially generate added rainfall; such operations resulted in moderate precipitation over the targeted area. Overall, Morakot caused roughly $31 million in damage and three deaths.

=== Typhoon Etau (Kabayan) ===
- Very strong typhoon (JMA)
- Category 3 typhoon (SSHWS)
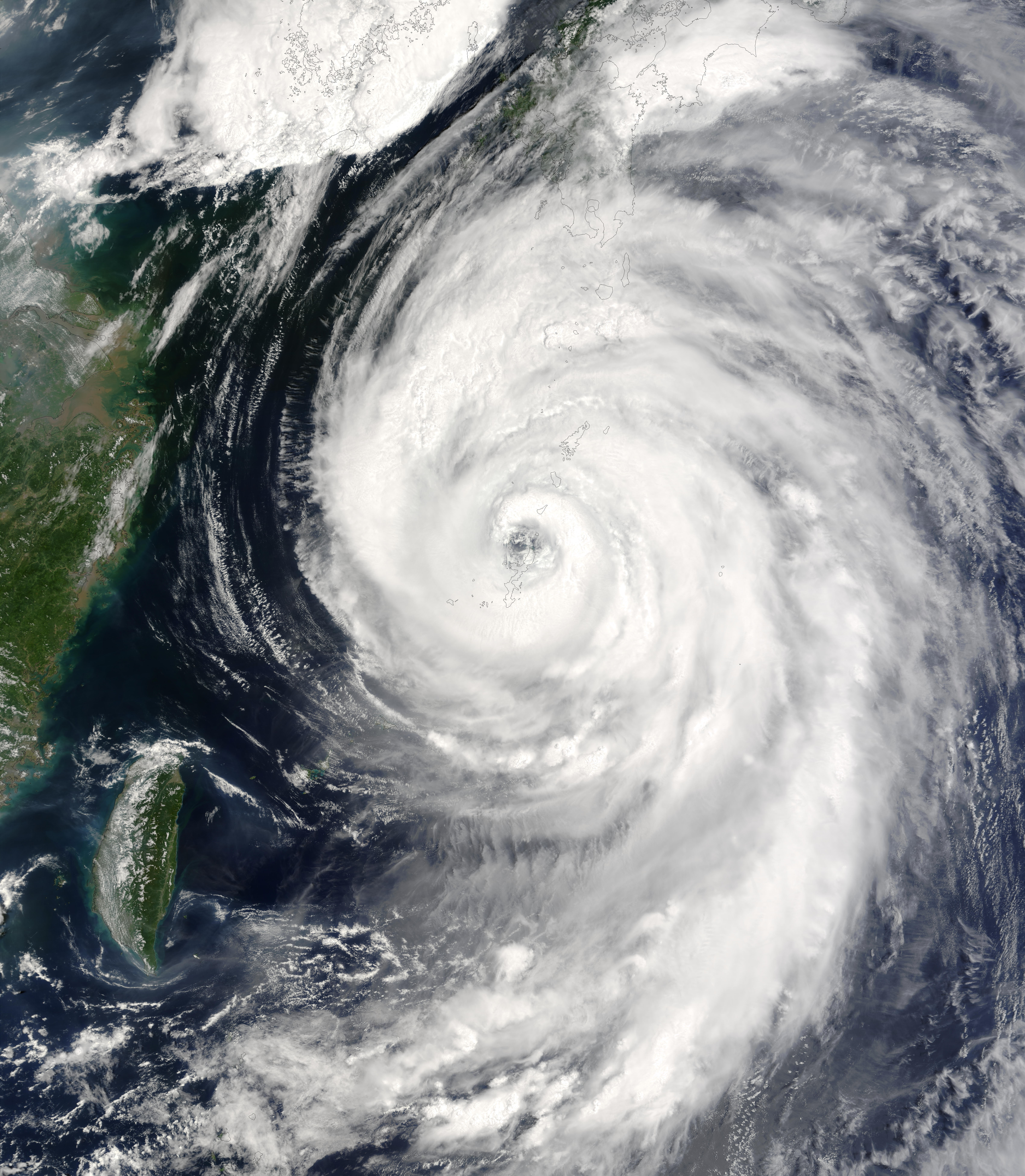
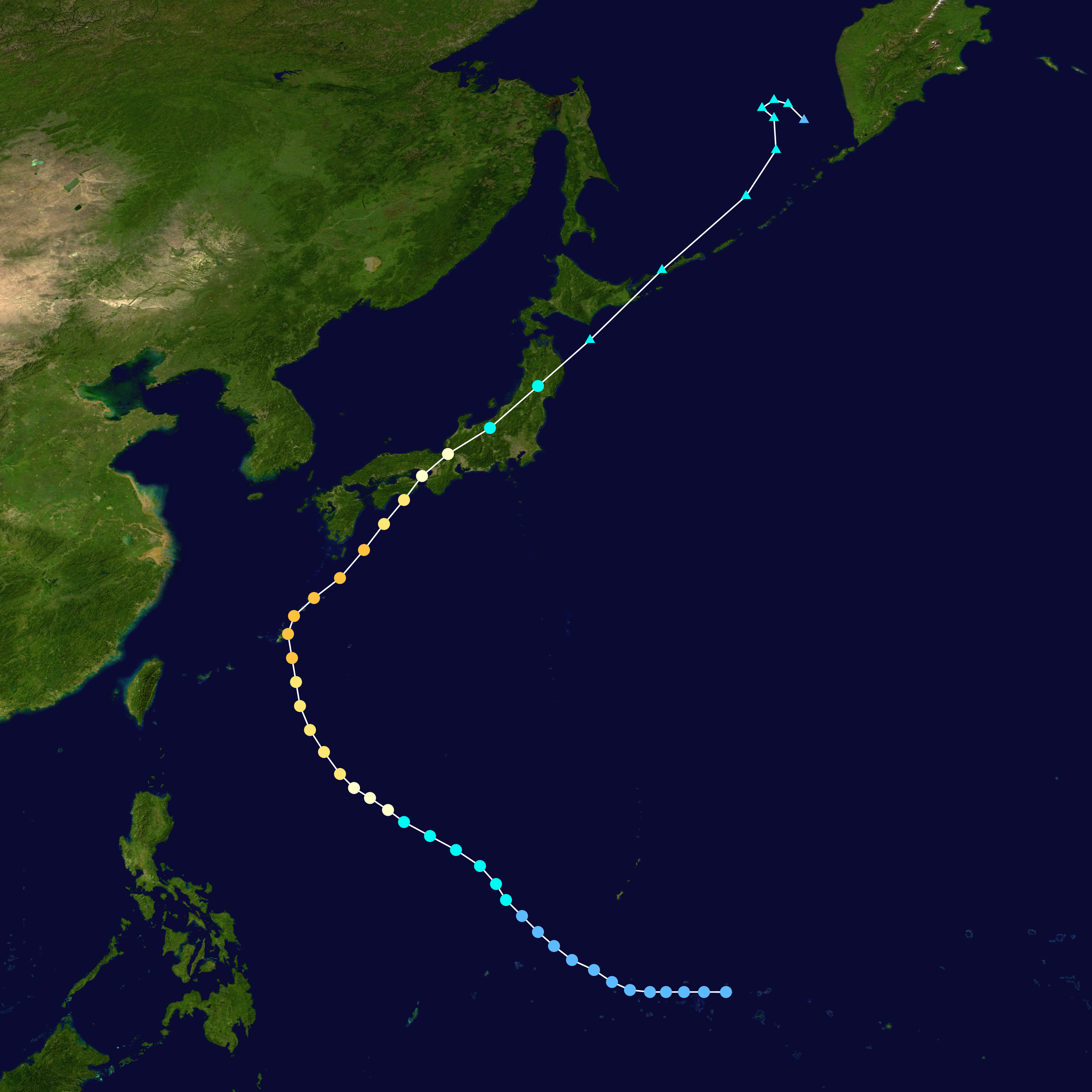
- Duration: August 2 – August 9
- Peak intensity: 155 km/h (100 mph) (10-min); 945 hPa (mbar)

A tropical depression developed on August 2 southeast of Guam, and gradually intensified while moving to the northwest, becoming a tropical storm on August 3 and a typhoon a day later. Etau formed an eye and became a large storm by the time it approached Okinawa on August 7. The typhoon attained peak winds of 155 km/h (96 mph) before weakening slightly while turning to the northeast. Etau made landfall on the Japanese island of Shikoku on August 8, and later moved across portions of Honshu and Hokkaido. After weakening to tropical storm status, the cyclone became extratropical on August 9 and dissipated three days later.

While passing northeast of the Philippines, the typhoon caused light damage in the archipelago. The eye crossed over Okinawa, where Etau left 166,800 people without power and caused 10 injuries. Near where Etau first struck Japan, Muroto reported a peak wind gust of 166 km/h (103 mph), at the time the third strongest on record there. The typhoon also dropped torrential rainfall peaking at 683 mm (26.9 in). The combination of winds and rainfall caused landslides, particularly on Hokkaido. Nationwide, Etau killed 20 people, destroyed 708 houses, and caused ¥35.1 billion (JPY, $294.8 million USD) in damage.

=== Typhoon Krovanh (Niña) ===
- Typhoon (JMA)
- Category 2 typhoon (SSHWS)
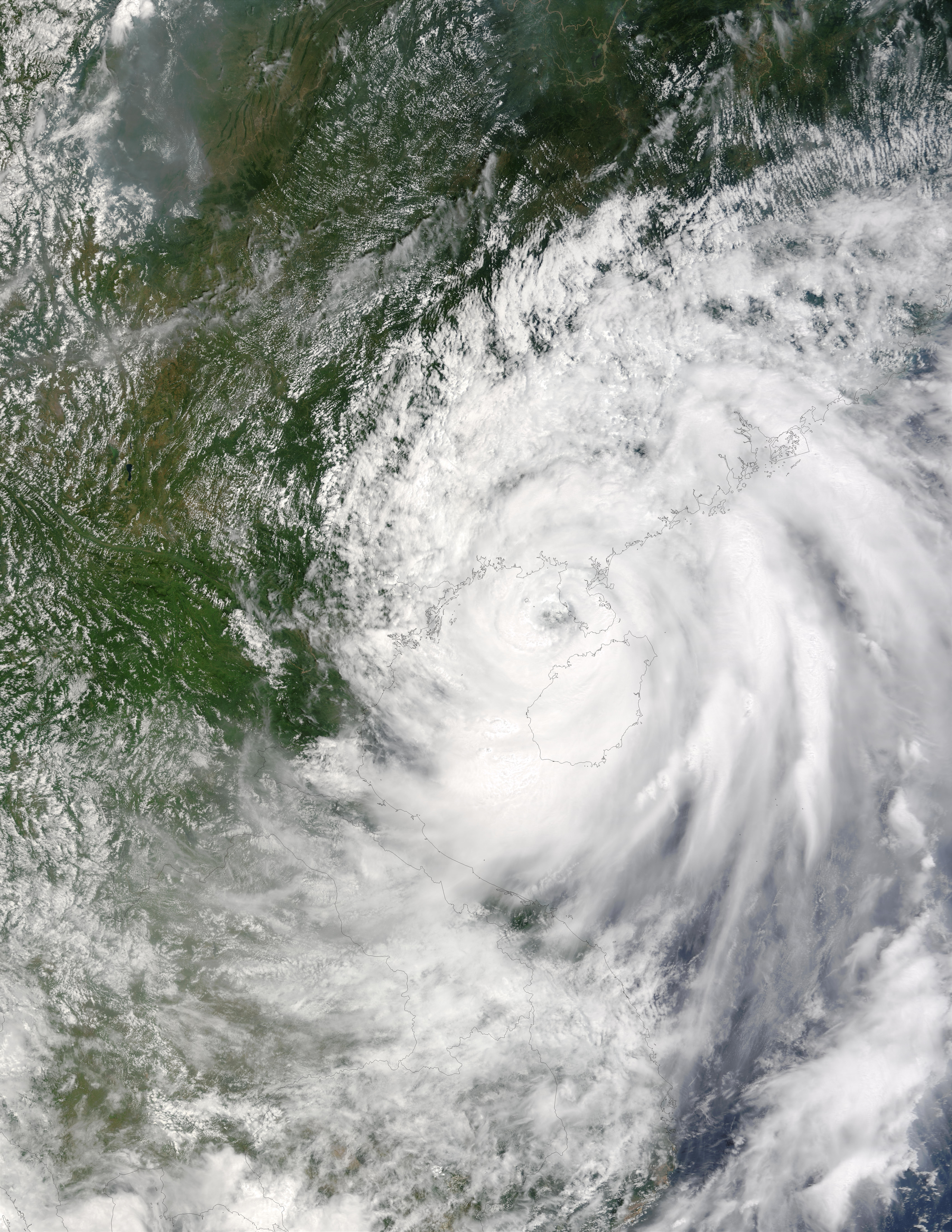
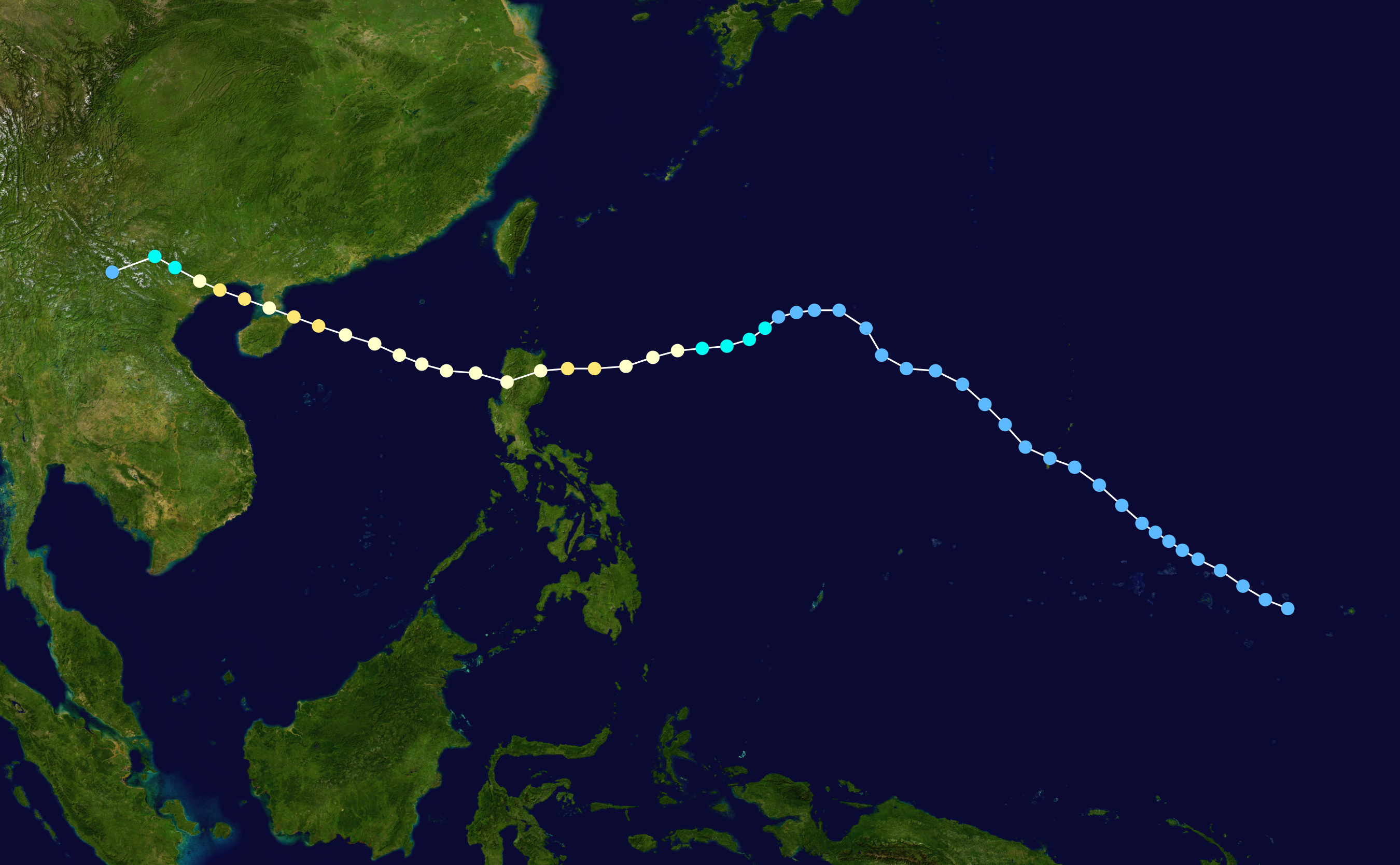
- Duration: August 13 – August 26
- Peak intensity: 120 km/h (75 mph) (10-min); 970 hPa (mbar)

A tropical depression formed within the monsoon trough, east of Chuuk State on August 13, but it degenerated into a remnant low five days later. The remnants reorganized into a tropical depression on August 19. A day later, it became Tropical Storm Krovanh, reaching typhoon status on August 22. Shortly after, Krovanh made landfall on Luzon at peak intensity with winds of 120 km/h (75 mph). The typhoon emerged into the South China Sea as a much weaker tropical storm, though it was able to restrengthen over warm waters. Once again at typhoon intensity, Krovanh clipped Hainan before moving over the Leizhou Peninsula on its way to a final landfall near Cẩm Phả, Vietnam on August 25. Quick weakening due to land interaction occurred as Krovanh moved across northern Vietnam, where the storm met its demise the following day.

Krovanh first struck the Philippines, resulting in heavy rainfall and displacing approximately 1,000 families. The flooding caused severe damage and killed one person. Krovanh's effects were much more severe in China. In Hong Kong, eleven people were injured and isolated flooding occurred as a result of the typhoon's outer rainbands. However, Guangdong Province, Hainan Province, and Guangxi were the Chinese regions most extensively impacted. The typhoon brought record wind gusts into Guangxi. In those three regions combined, 13,000 homes were estimated to have collapsed and a large swath of farmland was damaged. Two people were killed in China and economic losses approximated to ¥2.1 billion (US$253 million). Due to its positioning and track, of all areas in Vietnam only the country's more northern regions were impacted by Krovanh. Flash flooding occurred in earnest in those regions, and 1,000 homes were flattened. One person was killed and five others were injured in Vietnam. Overall, the typhoon was responsible for the deaths of four persons.

=== Tropical Storm Vamco (Manang) ===
- Tropical storm (JMA)
- Tropical storm (SSHWS)
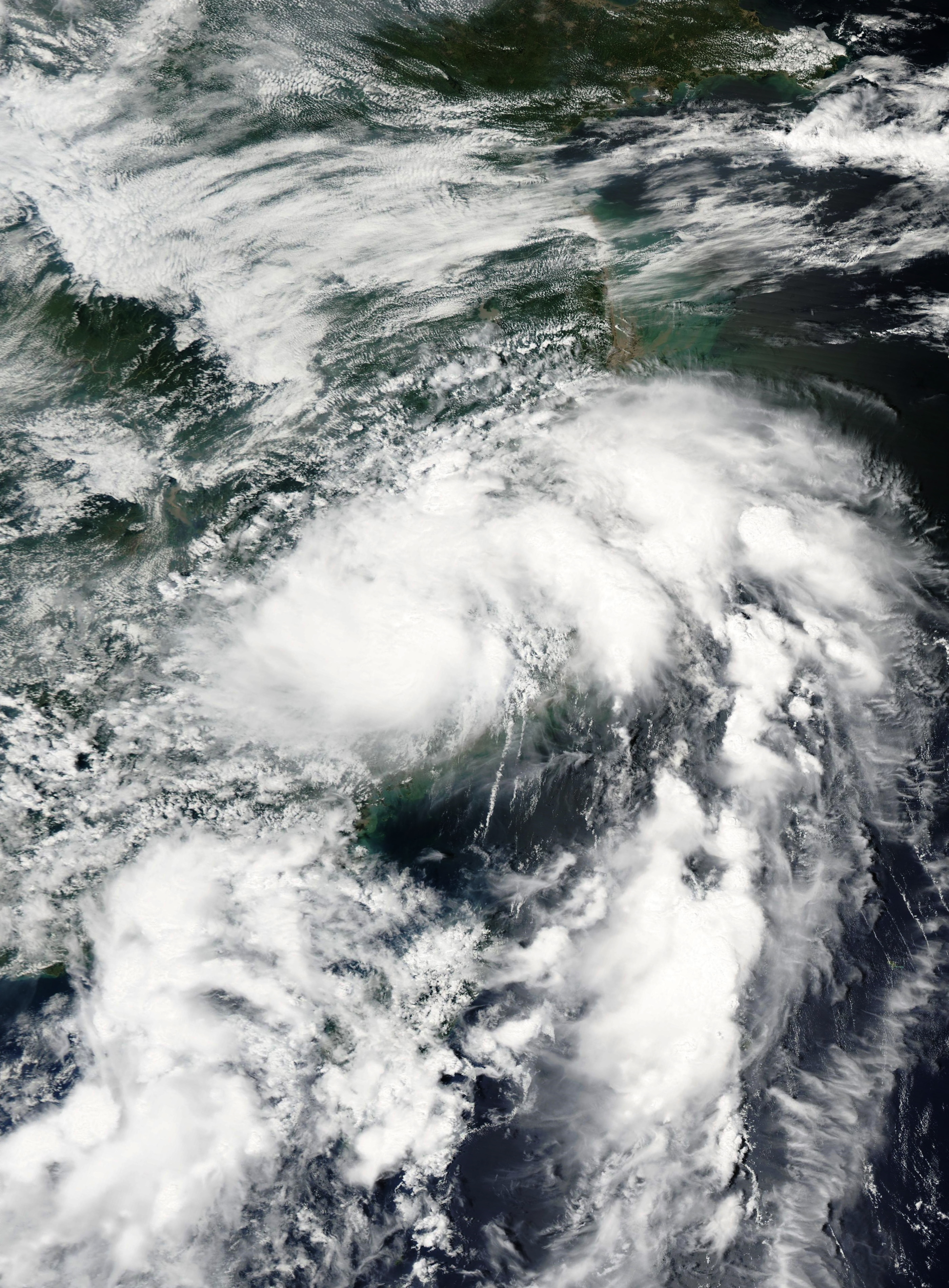
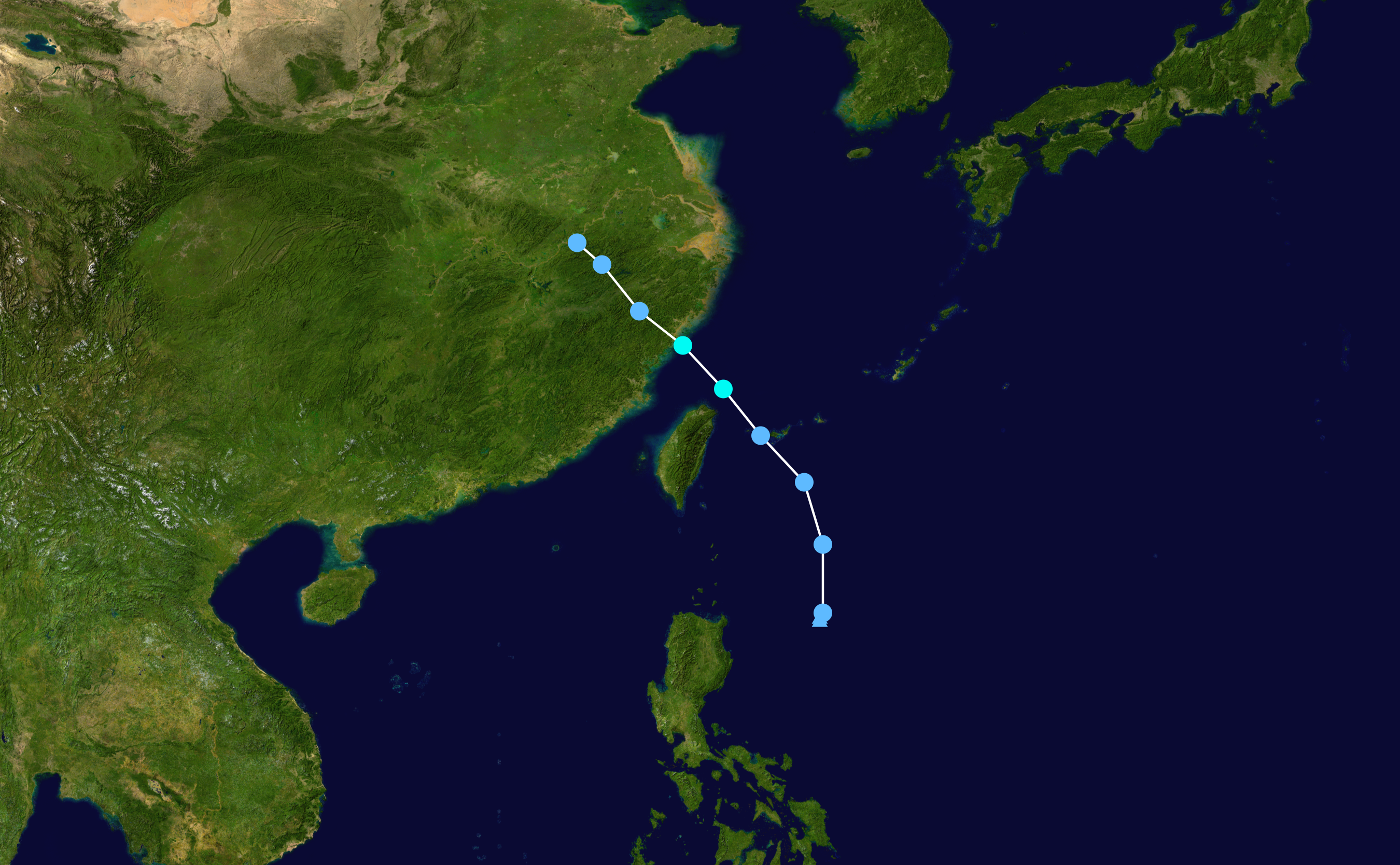
- Duration: August 18 – August 20
- Peak intensity: 65 km/h (40 mph) (10-min); 996 hPa (mbar)

The monsoon trough spawned several tropical disturbances in the middle of August, one of which became Tropical Depression Lakay near the Philippines. On August 18, an area of convection persisted on the southern side of a circulation, developing into a tropical depression east of Luzon. It moved quickly northward and later to the northwest in an area generally unfavorable for strengthening, such as the presence of wind shear and land interaction. On August 19, the JMA upgraded the depression to Tropical Storm Vamco to the east of Taiwan. Later that day, the circulation passed just 55 km (34 mi) north of Taipei, although the convection was exposed that time. On August 20, the JMA assessed Vamco as dissipating in the Taiwan Strait, although the JTWC continued advisories until the storm moved ashore in southeastern China.

Rainfall in Taiwan reached 69 mm (2.7 in) in Ilan County. On the island, the storm left several hundred houses without power due to a lightning strike. On mainland China, rainfall peaked at 101 mm (4.0 in) in Wenzhou, Zhejiang, which were largely beneficial in easing drought conditions, while winds gusted to 100 km/h (62 mph). The storm damaged or destroyed 5,880 houses and flooded 1,287 ha (3,180 acres) of paddy fields, causing ¥38.6 million (CNY, US$4.7 million) in damage.

=== Typhoon Dujuan (Onyok) ===
- Typhoon (JMA)
- Category 4 typhoon (SSHWS)
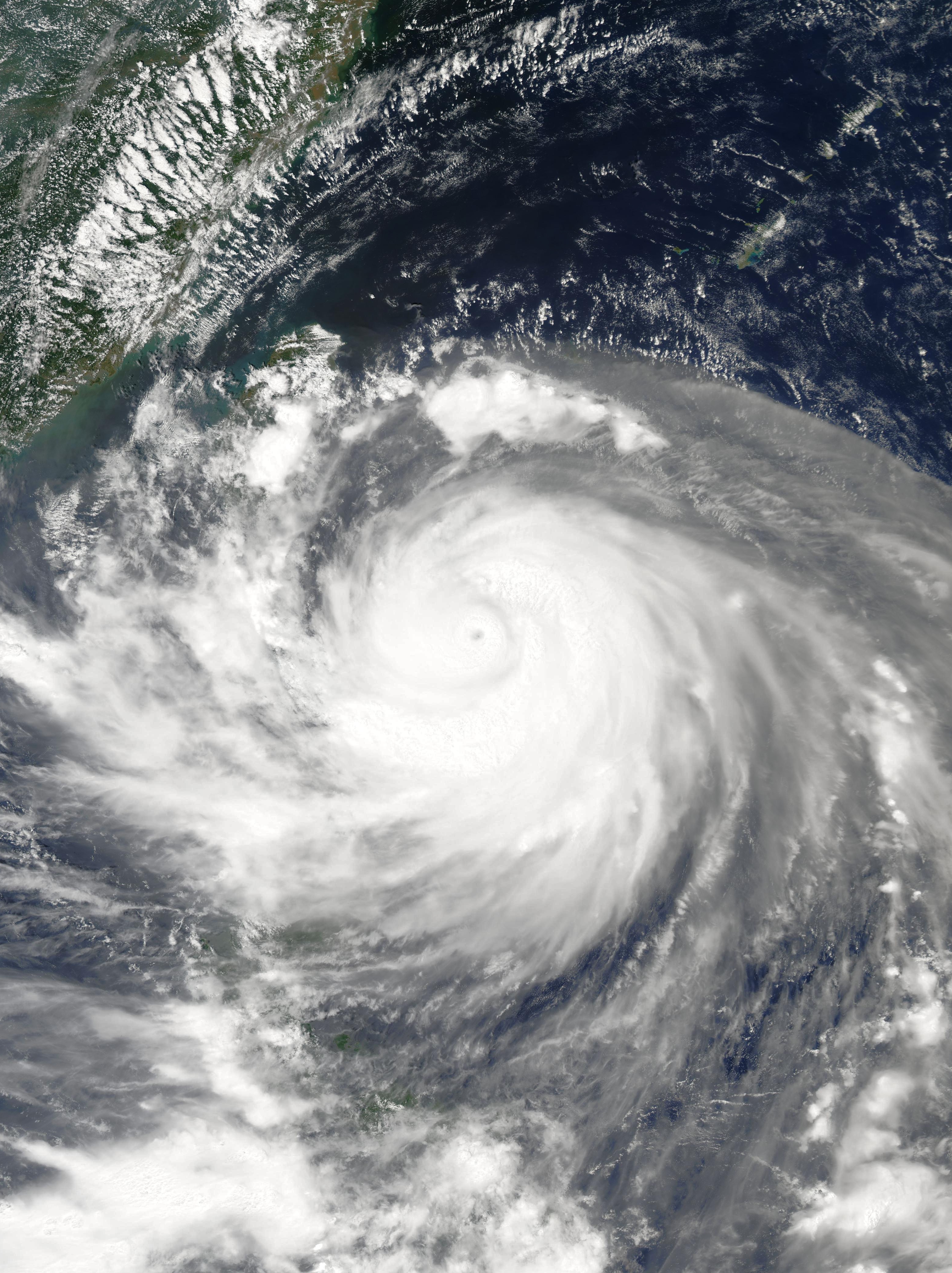
- Duration: August 27 – September 3
- Peak intensity: 150 km/h (90 mph) (10-min); 950 hPa (mbar)

On August 27, a tropical depression developed about 520 km (320 mi) northwest of Guam, which initially drifted to the southwest before turning to the northwest. On August 29, the JMA upgraded it to Tropical Storm Dujuan, and that day PAGASA began issuing advisories on Tropical Storm Onyok. The storm quickly intensified into a typhoon, after developing an eye in the center. On September 1, the JMA estimated Dujuan attained peak 10 minute winds of 150 km/h (93 mph), and the JTWC assessed peak 1–minute winds of 230 km/h (140 mph). While near peak intensity, the center of Dujuan passed about 45 km (28 mi) south of the southern tip of Taiwan. The typhoon weakened steadily and was a severe tropical storm by the time it made landfall on September 2 just east of Hong Kong. The JTWC estimated landfall winds of 185 km/h (115 mph), making it the strongest typhoon to strike the Pearl River Delta since Typhoon Hope in 1979. Dujuan rapidly weakened while continuing westward through China, dissipating on September 3 over Guangxi.

In the Philippines, Dujuan interacted with the monsoon to produce heavy rainfall, killing one person. While in the vicinity, Dujuan produced gusts of 100 km/h (62 mph) on Yonaguni, a Japanese subdivision of Okinawa. Heavy rainfall in Taiwan reached 628 mm (24.7 in) in Pingtung County, and winds peaked at 176 km/h (109 mph) on Orchid Island before the anemometer was destroyed. The caused about NT$200 (NWD, $115 million USD) in crop damage, and killed three people. Damage was minor in Hong Kong, and four fishermen were missing and presumed drowned after their boat sank. On the Chinese mainland, strong winds left 90% of the city of Shenzhen without power, and killed 16 construction workers due to a half-finished building collapsing. Across Guangdong, the typhoon damaged crops and destroyed 54,000 homes were destroyed. Overall damage in China was estimated at ¥2.3 billion (CNY, US$277 million), and across Guangdong, the typhoon killed 40 people.

=== Typhoon Maemi (Pogi) ===
- Violent typhoon (JMA)
- Category 5 super typhoon (SSHWS)
- Duration: September 5 – September 13
- Peak intensity: 195 km/h (120 mph) (10-min); 910 hPa (mbar)

Typhoon Maemi formed on September 4 from the monsoon trough in the western Pacific Ocean. It slowly intensified into a tropical storm while moving northwestward, and Maemi became a typhoon on September 8. That day, it quickly intensified due to favorable conditions, developing a well-defined eye and reaching peak maximum sustained winds of 195 km/h (121 mph). While near peak intensity, Maemi was decelerating and began turning to the north-northeast. The eyewall soon after passed over the Japanese island of Miyako-jima on September 10, producing the fourth lowest pressure on record in Japan after a pressure of 912 mbar (26.9 inHg) was recorded. With warm waters, Maemi was able to maintain much of its intensity before it made landfall just west of Busan, South Korea on September 12. On Jeju Island, Maemi produced a peak wind gust of 216 km/h (134 mph) and a minimum pressure of 950 mbar (28 inHg), both setting records for the country, and making it the most powerful typhoon to strike South Korea since record-keeping began in the country in 1904. The typhoon became extratropical in the Sea of Japan the next day, although the remnants persisted for several more days, bringing strong winds to northern Japan.

The typhoon first affected the Ryukyu Islands of Japan. On Miyako-jima, strong winds damaged 104 buildings, and 95% of residents lost power. Maemi dropped heavy rainfall there, including rates of 58.5 mm (2.30 in) in an hour, and 402.5 mm (15.85 in) in 24 hours, the latter setting a record. One person died on Miyako-jima after being struck by flying glass. Elsewhere in Japan, the storm caused flights to be canceled, while rainfall-induced landslides blocked roads. There were two other deaths in Japan, and damage totaled ¥11.3 billion (JPY, $96 million USD). Damage was heaviest in South Korea, notably where it moved ashore. Winds in Busan near the landfall location reached 154 km/h (96 mph), the second-highest on record. There, the port sustained heavy damage, causing disruptions to exports in the months following the storm. Nationwide, the high winds destroyed about 5,000 houses and damaged 13,000 homes and businesses, leaving 25,000 people homeless. About 1.47 million lost power, and widespread crop damage occurred, resulting in the worst rice crop in 23 years. Across South Korea, Maemi killed 117 people, and overall damage totaled ₩5.52 trillion won (US$4.8 billion).

=== Typhoon Choi-wan (Roskas) ===
- Typhoon (JMA)
- Category 3 typhoon (SSHWS)
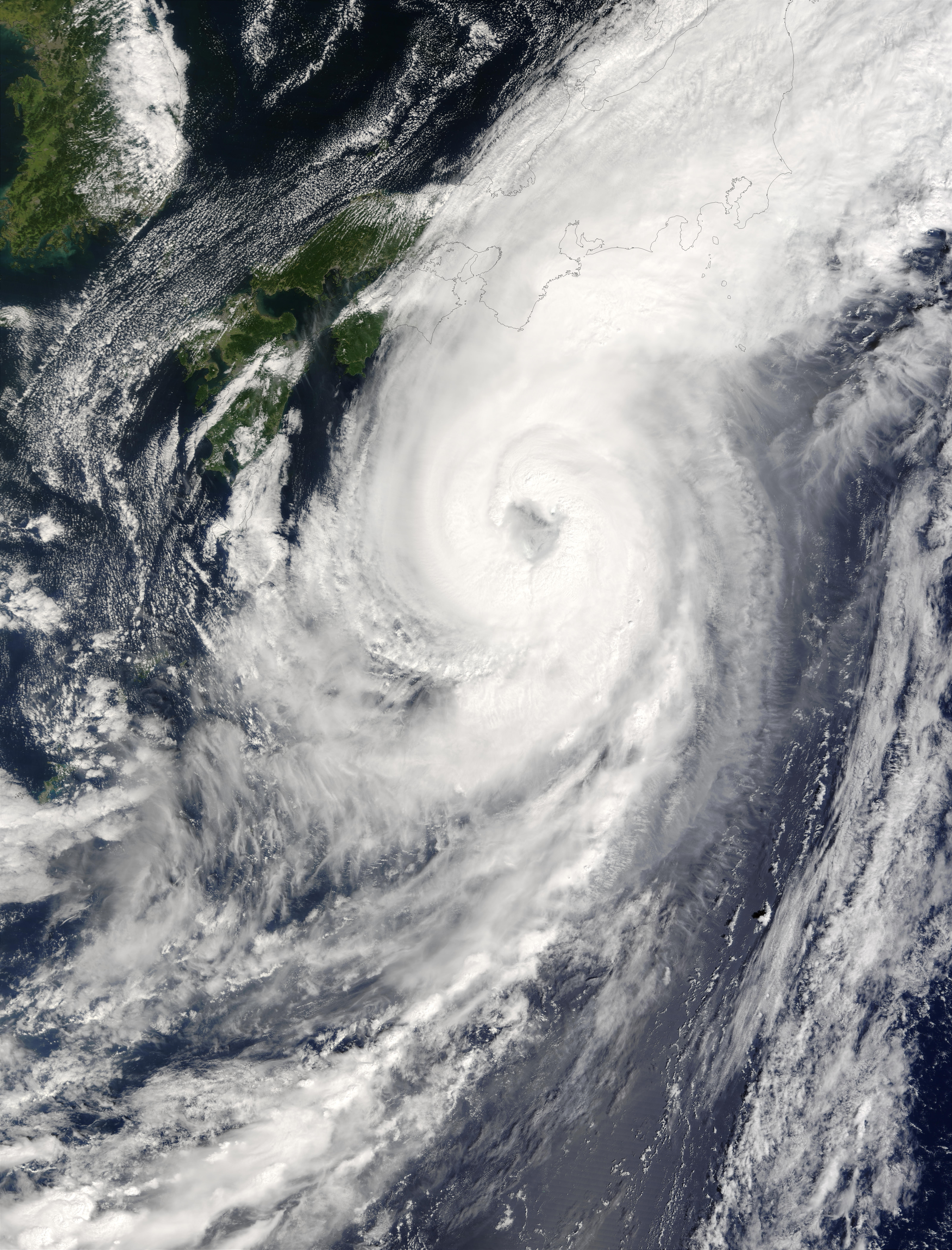
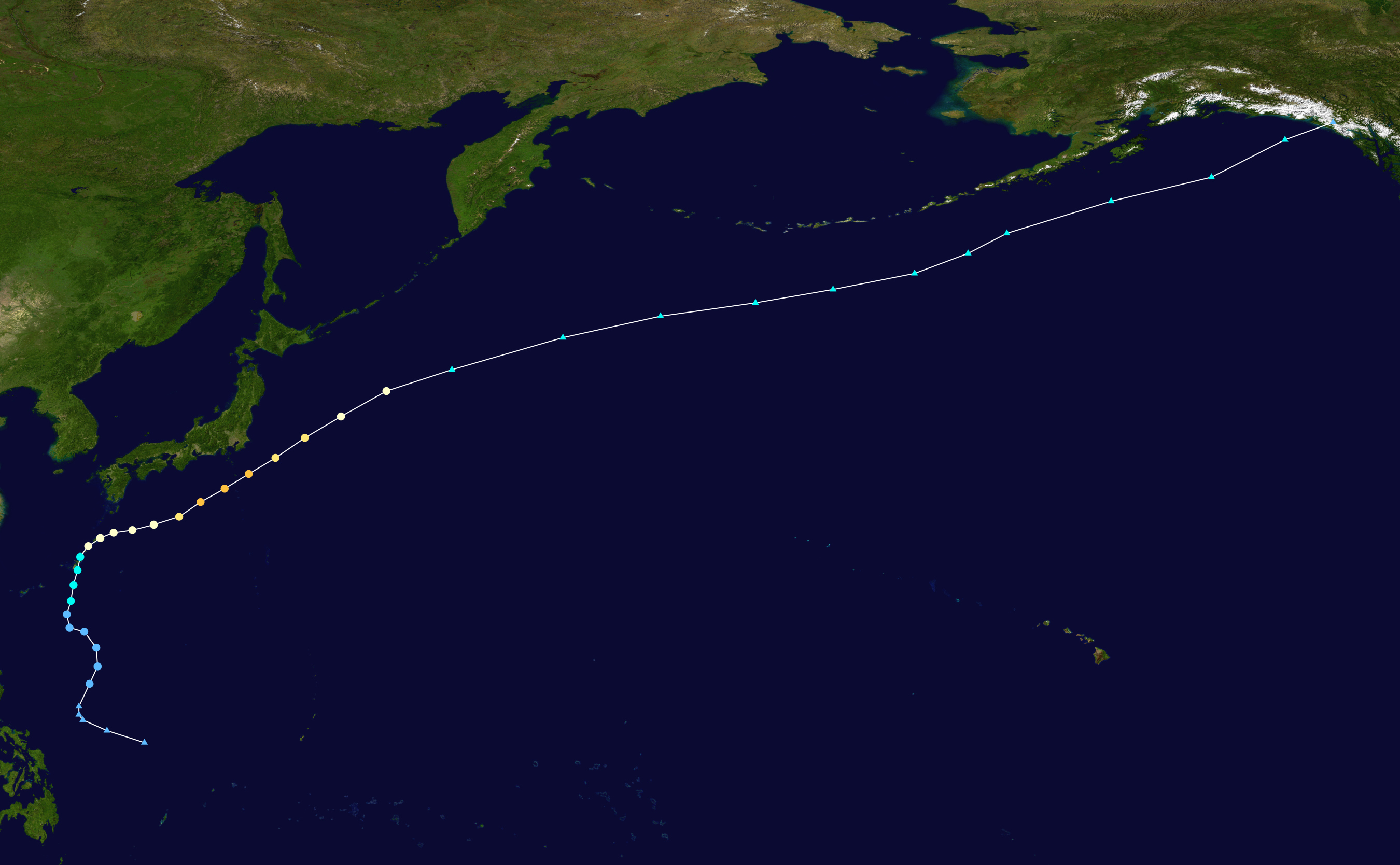
- Duration: September 16 – September 23
- Peak intensity: 130 km/h (80 mph) (10-min); 955 hPa (mbar)

In the middle of September, the monsoon trough spawned a rapidly organizing disturbance east-northeast of Luzon, with weak wind shear and favorable conditions. On September 16, the JMA classified it as a tropical depression, and the JTWC initiated advisories the next day. The system moved to the northwest due to the subtropical ridge to the northeast and later to the north. On September 18, the JMA upgraded the depression to Tropical Storm Choi-wan, the same day that PAGASA classified it as Tropical Storm Roskas (the only time this name was used, as it was retired the following year). An eastward-moving trough turned the storm to the northeast, bringing the track over Okinawa and Amami Ōshima on September 19. Choi-wan continued gradually intensifying, becoming a typhoon on September 20 to the southeast of Japan. That day, the JMA estimated peak winds of 130 km/h (81 mph), and the JTWC estimated peak 1 minute winds of 185 km/h (115 mph) on September 21, after Choi-wan developed a well-defined eye. The typhoon weakened due to increasing wind shear, deteriorating to severe tropical storm status on September 22 before JMA declared it extratropical on September 23. The remnants of Choi-wan continued to the northeast, exited the basin on September 24, and eventually struck southern Alaska on September 25.

Wind gusts in Okinawa reached 115 km/h (71 mph), while on the volcanic island of Hachijō-jima, gusts reached 214 km/h (133 mph). On the Japanese mainland, winds gusted to 126 km/h (78 mph) at Chōshi, Chiba. Choi-wan dropped heavy rainfall while near Japan, peaking at 316 mm (12.4 in) on Miyake-jima. In Okinawa, Choi-wan flooded a boat, forcing its occupants to be rescued by the Coast Guard. Also on the island, heavy rainfall caused landslides and flooded houses. In Amami Ōshima, the storm left 10,810 people without power. On Hachijō, wind gusts of 214 km/h (133 mph) damaged about 200 houses. Nationwide, Choi-wan destroyed 191 homes, injured 9 people, and left about ¥300 million (JPY, US$2.5 million).

=== Typhoon Koppu (Sikat) ===
- Typhoon (JMA)
- Category 2 typhoon (SSHWS)
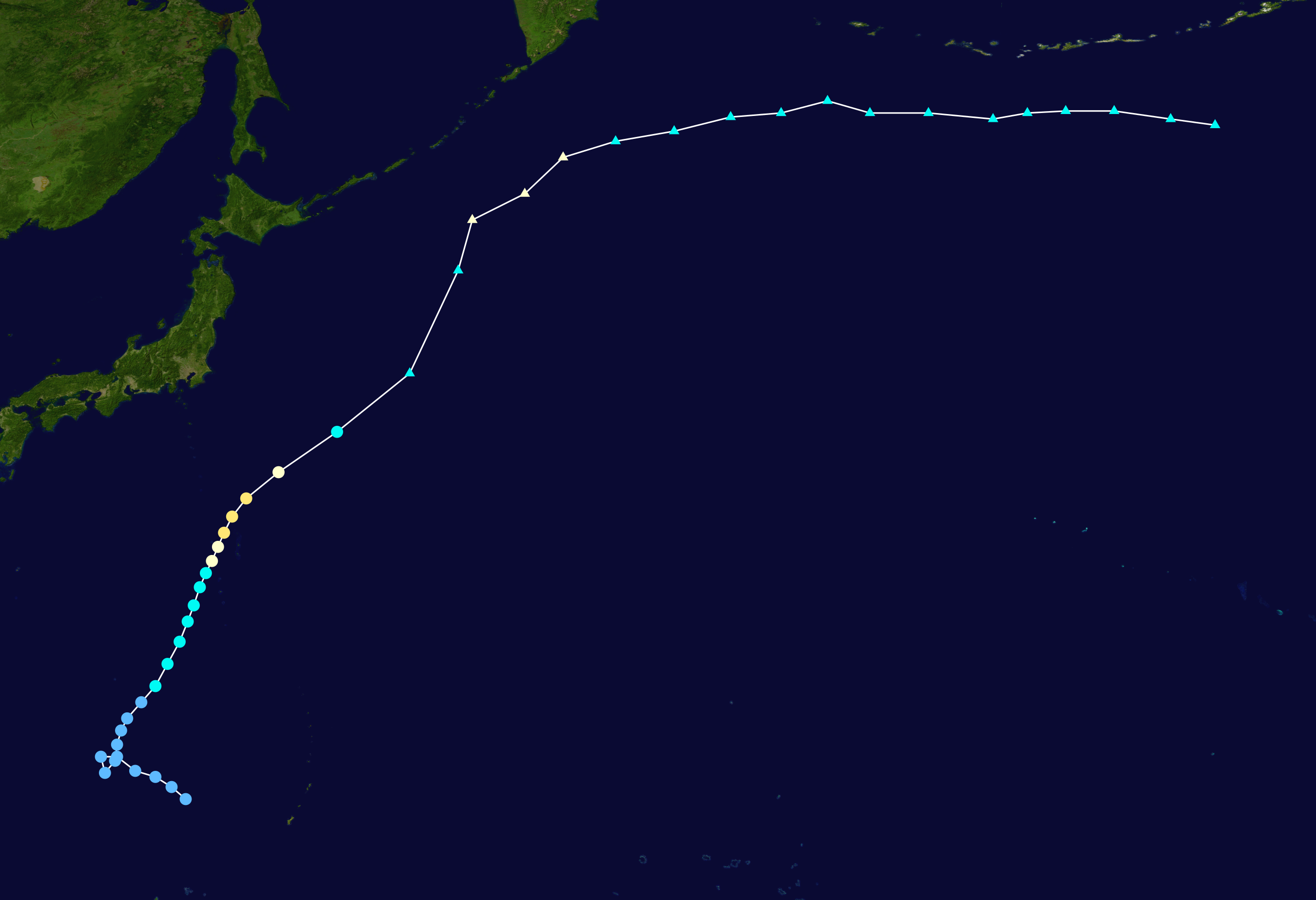
- Duration: September 24 – September 30
- Peak intensity: 130 km/h (80 mph) (10-min); 960 hPa (mbar)

Towards the end of September, the monsoon trough spawned a tropical disturbance east-northeast of Yap, which became a tropical depression on September 24. There were initially several circulations, with a tropical upper tropospheric trough to the northeast increasing outflow. After slowing and turning to the northeast, the depression intensified into Tropical Storm Koppu on September 26. After the storm developed a large eye feature, the JTWC upgraded it to typhoon status on September 27, although the JMA did not follow suit until the following day while near Chichi-jima. Also that day, Koppu passed 95 km (59 mi) west of Iwo Jima, and the JMA estimated peak 10 minute winds of 130 km/h (81 mph). The JTWC estimated peak 1 minute winds of 165 km/h (103 mph), before an approaching trough caused the typhoon to accelerate northeastward. The convection diminished near the center, causing Koppu to become extratropical on September 30. The remnants continued generally northeastward through the Aleutian Islands, eventually passing south of mainland Alaska on October 7.

On Chichi-jima, Typhoon Koppu produced sustained winds of 102 km/h (63 mph), with gusts to 200 km/h (120 mph), which was the third strongest on record for the station. Rainfall there reached 183 mm (7.2 in). Wind gusts on Iwo Jima peaked at 109 km/h (68 mph).

=== Tropical Depression 19W ===
- Tropical depression (SSHWS)
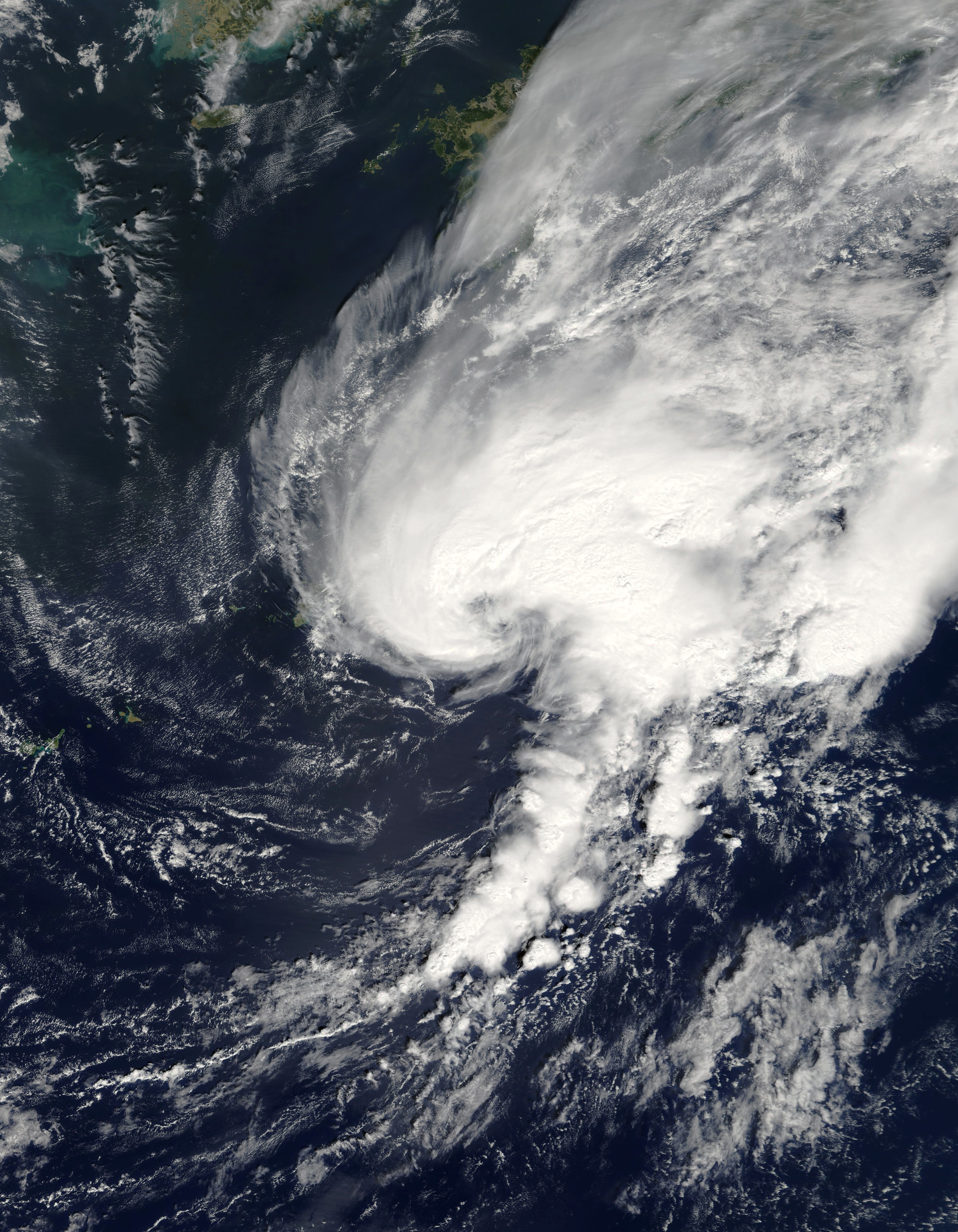
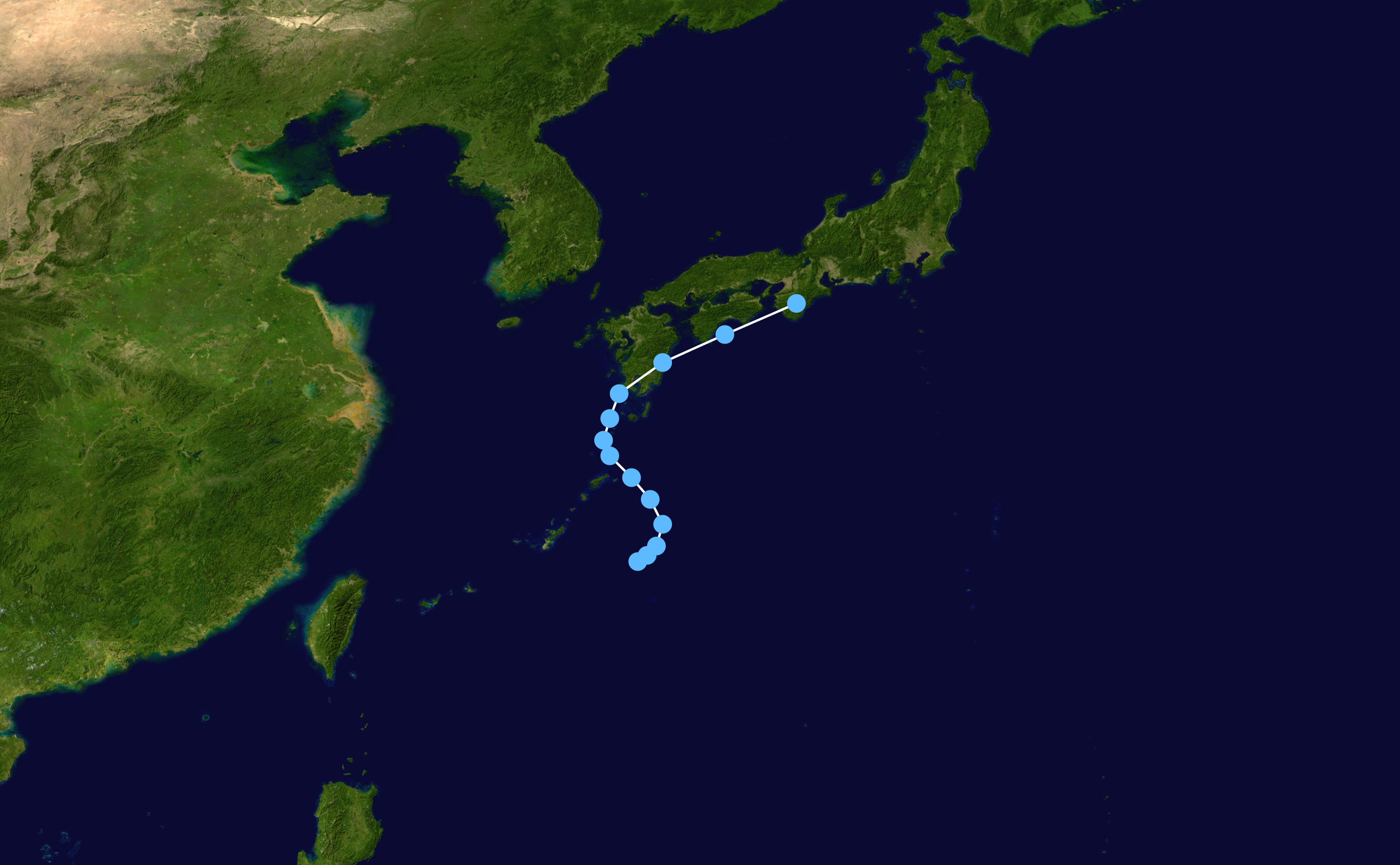
- Duration: October 10 – October 13
- Peak intensity: 55 km/h (35 mph) (1-min); 1000 hPa (mbar)

Tropical Depression 19W developed on October 12 after an extratropical storm produced an area of convection. Described as a subtropical low, the depression moved generally northeastward toward Japan due to an approaching cold front. The depression moved through Kyushu and Honshu before dissipating on October 13. The depression dropped 285 mm (11.2 in) of rainfall at Ikegawa in Kōchi, while strong winds associated reached 217 km/h (135 mph) through a storm-produced downburst. The winds knocked over two cranes, killing two people, and left about 9,000 homes without power. The depression also killed two people due to drownings.

=== Typhoon Ketsana (Tisoy) ===
- Very strong typhoon (JMA)
- Category 4 typhoon (SSHWS)
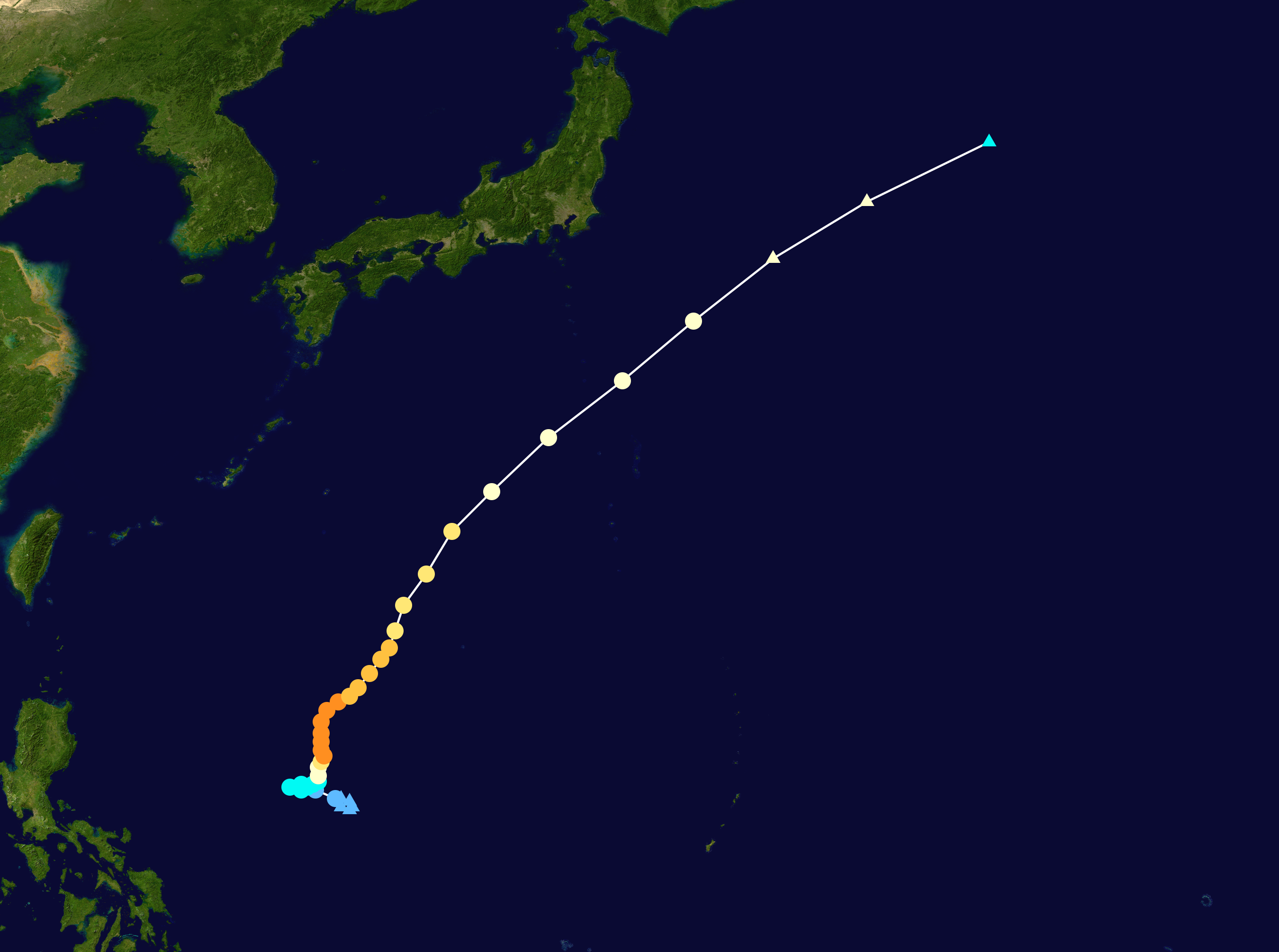
- Duration: October 17 – October 27
- Peak intensity: 165 km/h (105 mph) (10-min); 940 hPa (mbar)

In the middle of October, an area of convection persisted along the monsoon trough between Luzon and Guam, developing into a tropical depression on October 17. The same monsoon trough later spawned Typhoon Parma to the east. For several days, the system remained disorganized while drifting to the west-northwest due to weak steering currents south of the subtropical ridge. On October 19, the JMA upgraded the depression to Tropical Storm Ketsana, and by that time the storm had begun drifting to the northeast. With favorable outflow, Ketsana quickly intensified into a typhoon on October 20 after developing an eye, and two days later, the JMA estimated peak winds of 165 km/h (103 mph). The JTWC estimated peak 1 minute winds of 230 km/h (140 mph) around the time the well-defined eye had expanded to 37 km (23 mi). Subsequently, the typhoon accelerated northeastward into the westerlies and began weakening due to increasing wind shear and dry air. On October 26, Ketsana became extratropical to the east of Japan and dissipated the next day. The passage of the typhoon caused surface chlorophyll a concentration in the ocean to increase 30-fold.

=== Typhoon Parma ===
- Very strong typhoon (JMA)
- Category 4 super typhoon (SSHWS)
- Duration: October 19 – October 31
- Peak intensity: 175 km/h (110 mph) (10-min); 930 hPa (mbar)

The same monsoon trough that spawned Typhoon Koppu also produced an area of convection to the north-northeast of Guam, becoming a tropical depression on October 19. The system moved northwestward and later turned to the northeast around the subtropical ridge. With low wind shear and favorable outflow, the convection became better organized, and the JMA upgraded it to Tropical Storm Parma on October 21. After an eye began to form, Parma was upgraded to typhoon status the next day. An approaching trough caused Parma to accelerate northeastward while also increasing outflow. On October 24, the JMA estimated peak winds of 175 km/h (109 mph) while the JTWC estimated winds of 240 km/h (150 mph), an unusually high intensity for 30° N. Subsequently, Parma rounded the subtropical ridge and began moving to the east-southeast, beginning a nearly week-long loop. The cold front had passed to the north and failed to bring the typhoon northeastward.

Increasing wind shear weakened the convection, and Parma deteriorated into a severe tropical storm on October 26. The next day, it began moving westward while passing about 345 km (214 mi) north of Wake Island. A large eye of 110 km (68 mi) in diameter developed, and on October 28, the JMA re-upgraded Parma to typhoon status. The next day, the typhoon turned to the northeast due to another approaching trough. With decreasing wind shear and warmer waters, Parma re-intensified significantly on October 29, reaching a secondary peak of 165 km/h (103 mph) according to JMA, and 215 km/h (134 mph) according to JTWC. The storm moved very closely along the track it took several days prior. Increasing wind shear on October 30 caused rapid weakening, resulting in the eye dissipating. By the next day, the center was exposed, and Parma became extratropical, later exiting the basin on November 1. The remnants weakened, later turning to the southeast and dissipating on November 11 southwest of California.

=== Tropical Depression 22W (Ursula) ===
- Tropical depression (JMA)
- Tropical depression (SSHWS)
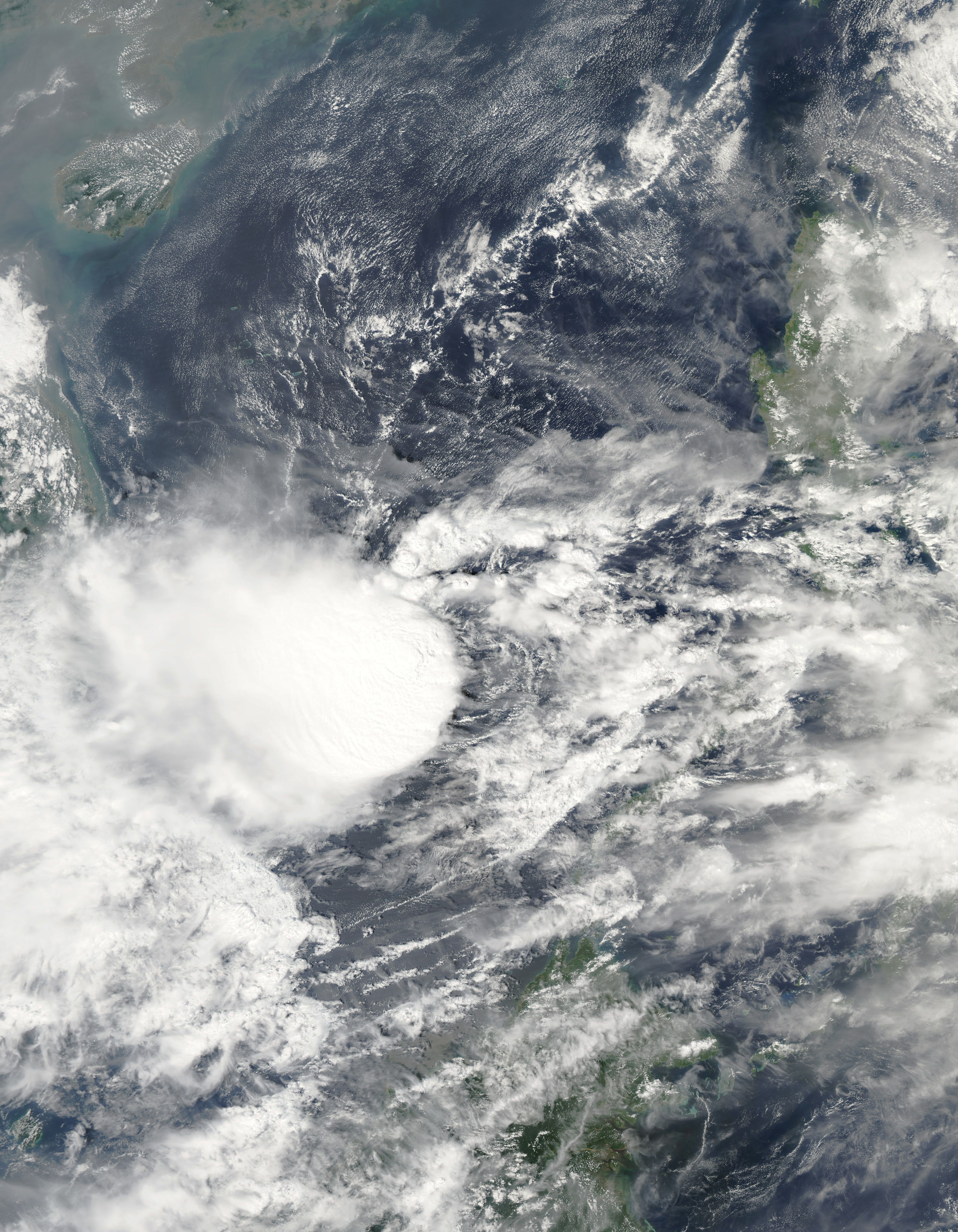
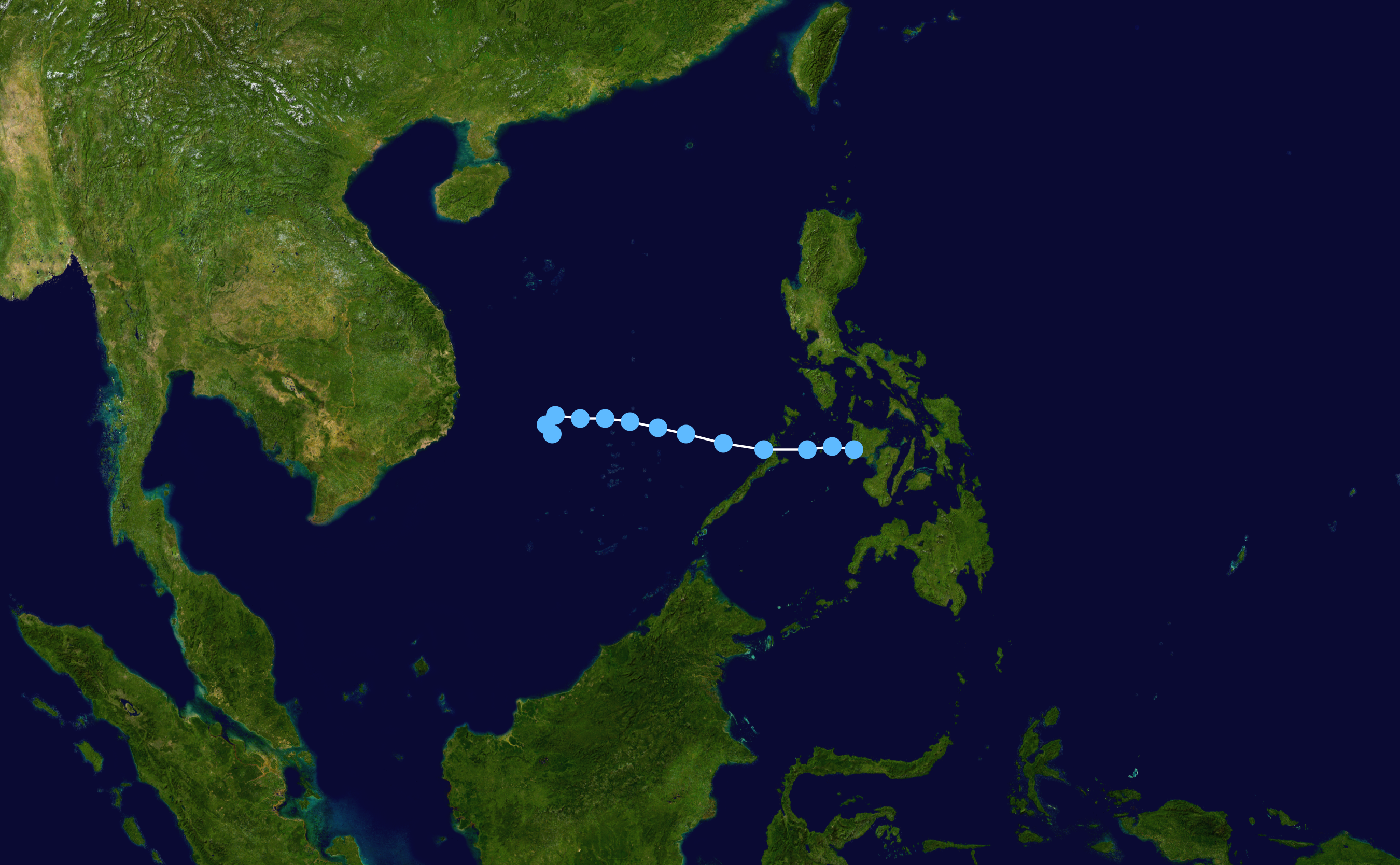
- Duration: October 21 – October 24
- Peak intensity: 55 km/h (35 mph) (10-min); 1004 hPa (mbar)

On October 22, a tropical depression developed in the South China Sea, classified by PAGASA as Ursula. The system moved eastward and crossed Palawan before dissipating on October 24. In the Philippines, the depression killed one person and caused minor damage.

=== Severe Tropical Storm Melor (Viring) ===
- Severe tropical storm (JMA)
- Category 1 typhoon (SSHWS)
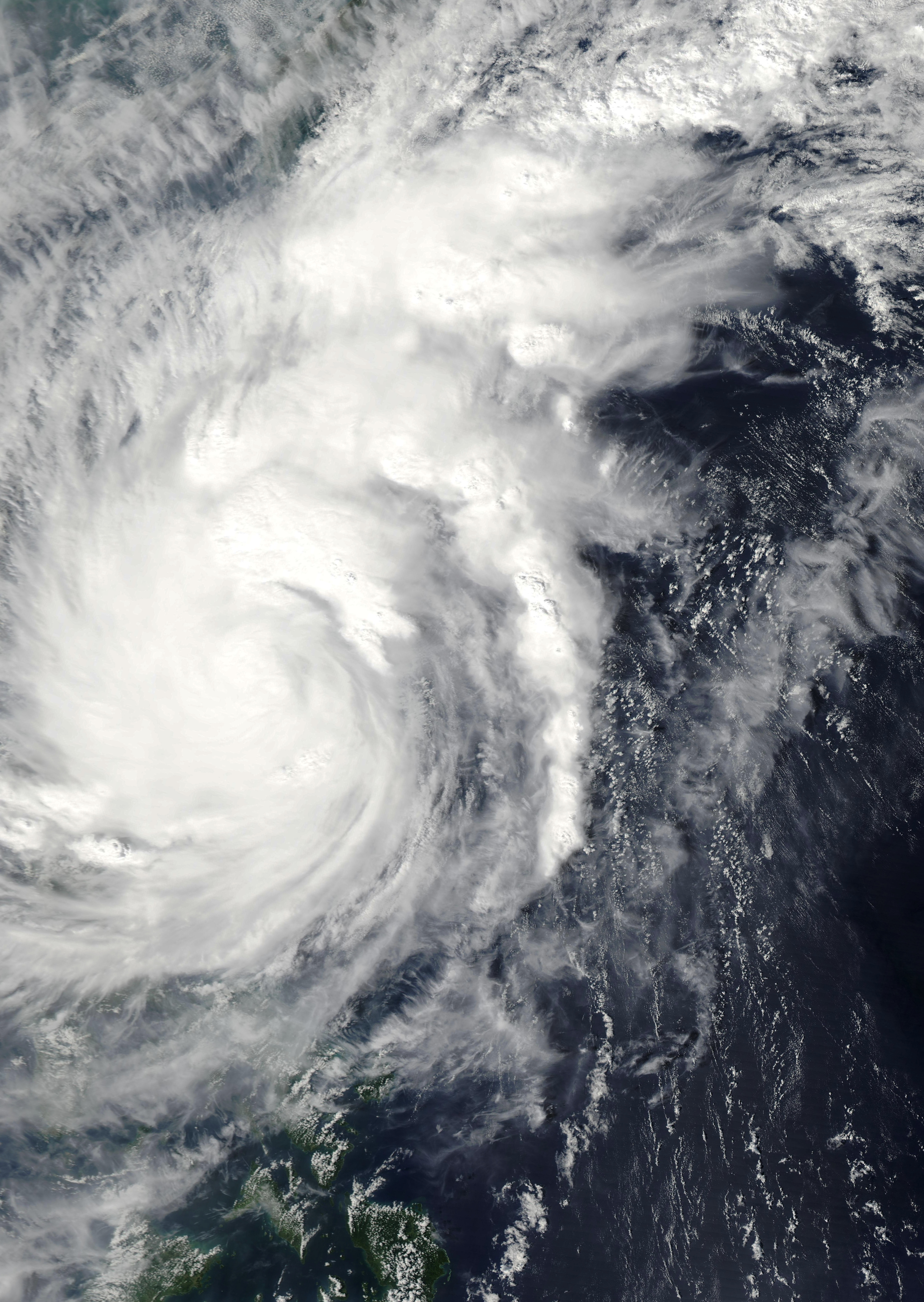
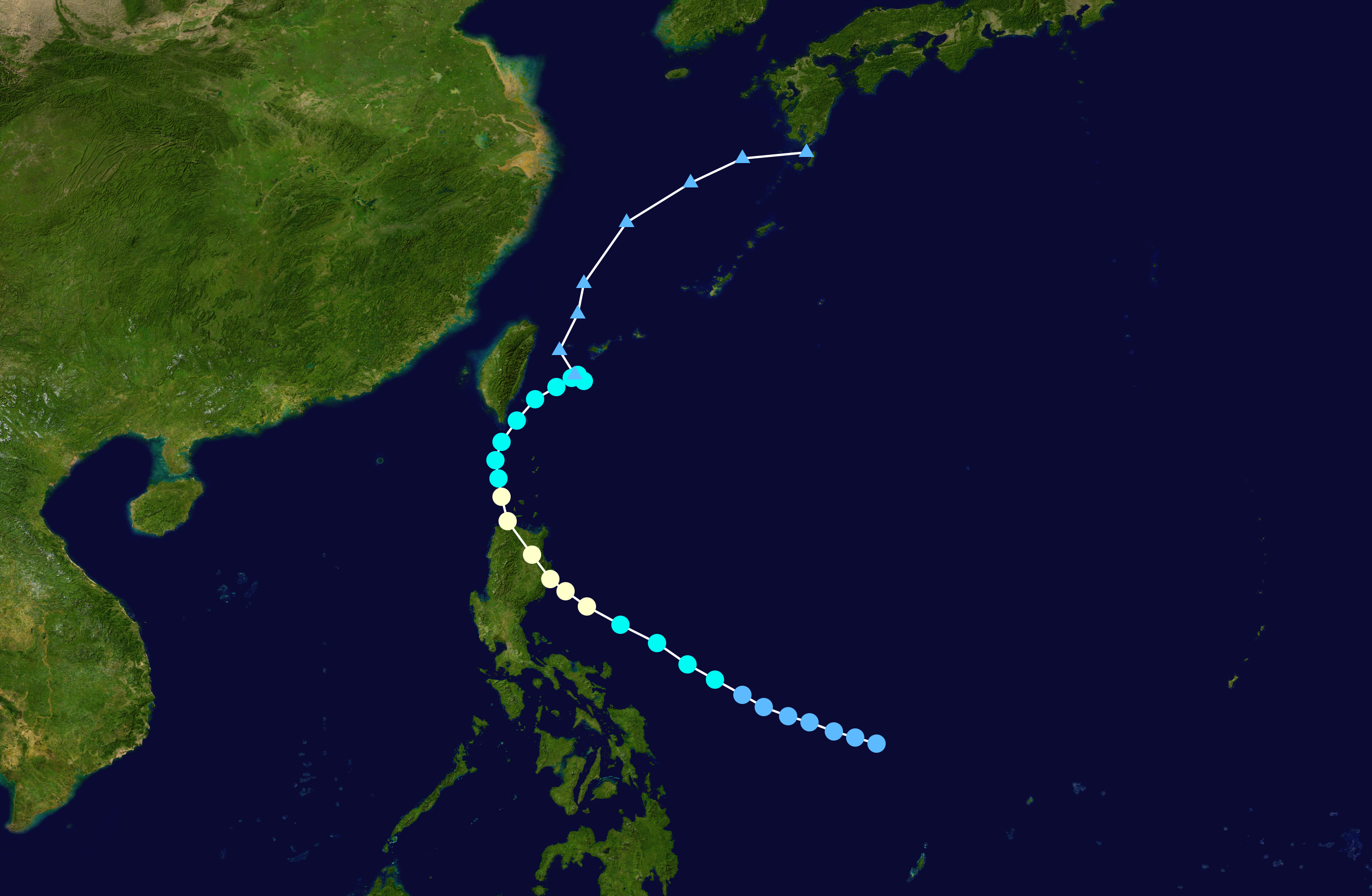
- Duration: October 29 – November 5
- Peak intensity: 95 km/h (60 mph) (10-min); 980 hPa (mbar)

Late in October, an area of convection persisted northwest of Palau and quickly organized into a tropical depression on October 29. Moving west-northwestward toward the Philippines due to a ridge to the east, the depression intensified into Tropical Storm Melor on October 30. With minimal wind shear, the storm strengthened further and developed a large eye. The JTWC upgraded Melor to typhoon status on October 31, estimating peak 1 minute winds of 140 km/h (87 mph), although the JMA estimated the storm only attained peak 10 minute winds of 95 km/h (59 mph). Early on November 1, Melor made landfall on northeastern Luzon in the Philippines, south of Palanan. The storm weakened over land and emerged into the South China Sea. By that time, it was moving northward along the periphery of the ridge to the east. On November 2, Melor turned to the northeast, passing just east of Taiwan. The next day, it weakened to tropical depression status, and after meandering offshore eastern Taiwan, Melor continued northeastward. It became extratropical on November 5 and dissipated the next day near southern Japan.

In the Philippines, Melor dropped about 150 mm (5.9 in) of rainfall, which flooded the Cagayan River and killed four people. In Taiwan, rainfall reached 554 mm (21.8 in) in Pingtung County. On the Japanese island of Hateruma, rainfall totaled 197 mm (7.8 in), which broke the hourly and daily record for the station in November.

=== Typhoon Nepartak (Weng) ===
- Typhoon (JMA)
- Category 1 typhoon (SSHWS)
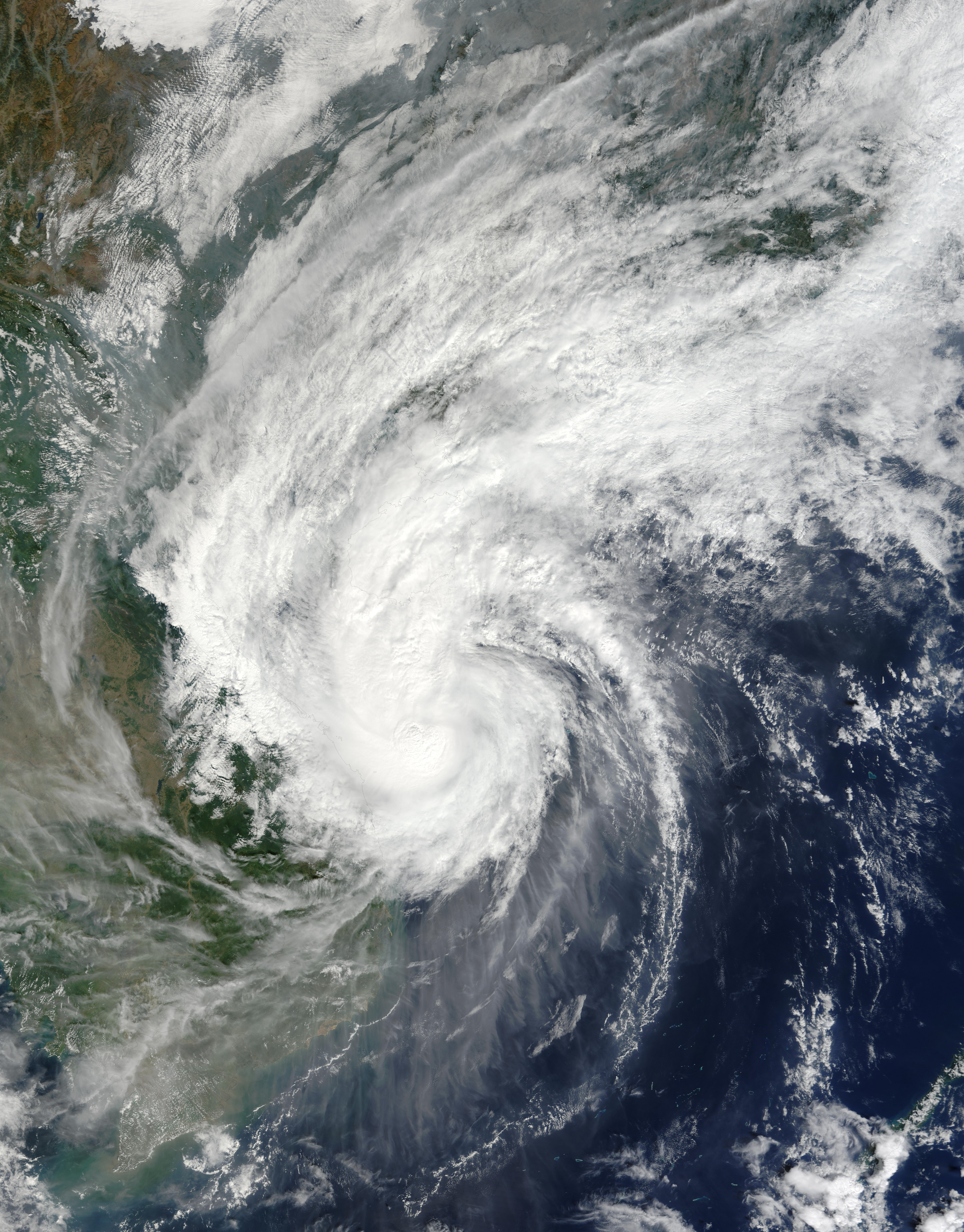
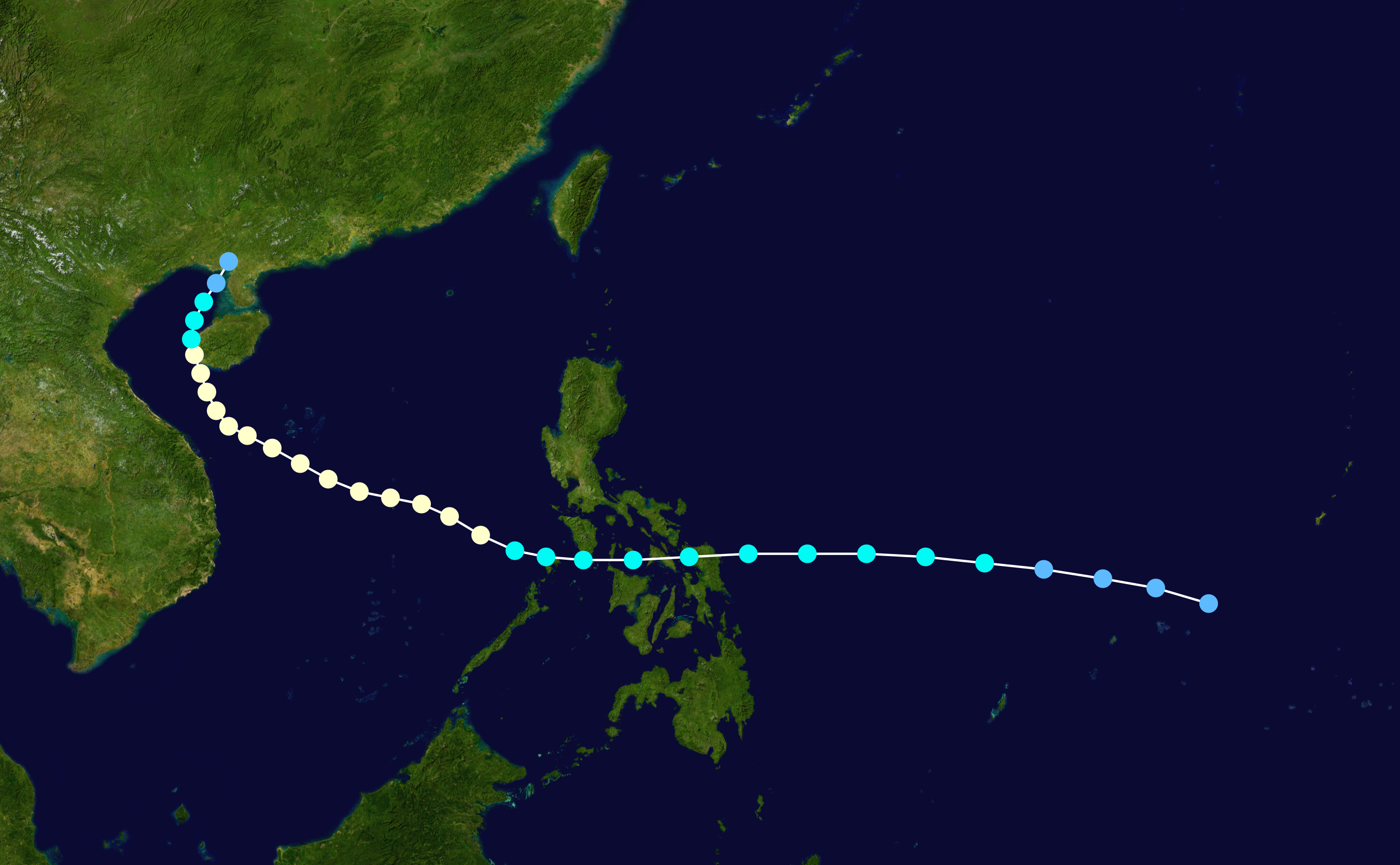
- Duration: November 11 – November 19
- Peak intensity: 120 km/h (75 mph) (10-min); 970 hPa (mbar)

A tropical depression developed near Yap on November 11, which strengthened into Tropical Storm Nepartak a day later, also named Weng by PAGASA. Moving westwardm Nepartak made landfall on northern Samar Island in the Philippines as a tropical storm on November 13. It crossed the island chain and emerged into the South China, where it quickly re-intensified. The JTWC estimated peak winds of 140 km/h (87 mph) on November 16, and later that day, the JMA upgraded the storm to typhoon status, estimating peak 10-minute winds of 120 km/h (75 mph). On November 18, Nepartak passed near southwestern Hainan and weakened. By the next day, the system weakened to tropical depression status, and dissipated shortly after moving ashore over Beihai, China.

In the Philippines, Nepartak produced strong winds, heavy rainfall, and rough seas, killing at least four people. The storm caused widespread power outages and ferry disruptions. On Hainan, the storm helped end one of the worst summer droughts in almost 65 years, although it also left heavy crop damage, wrecking 64,000 ha (160,000 acres) of fields and killing 400 head of livestock. With about 800 homes destroyed, damage on Hainan amounted to $197 million (2003 USD). Effects were minor in mainland China.

=== Typhoon Lupit (Yoyoy) ===
- Very strong typhoon (JMA)
- Category 5 super typhoon (SSHWS)
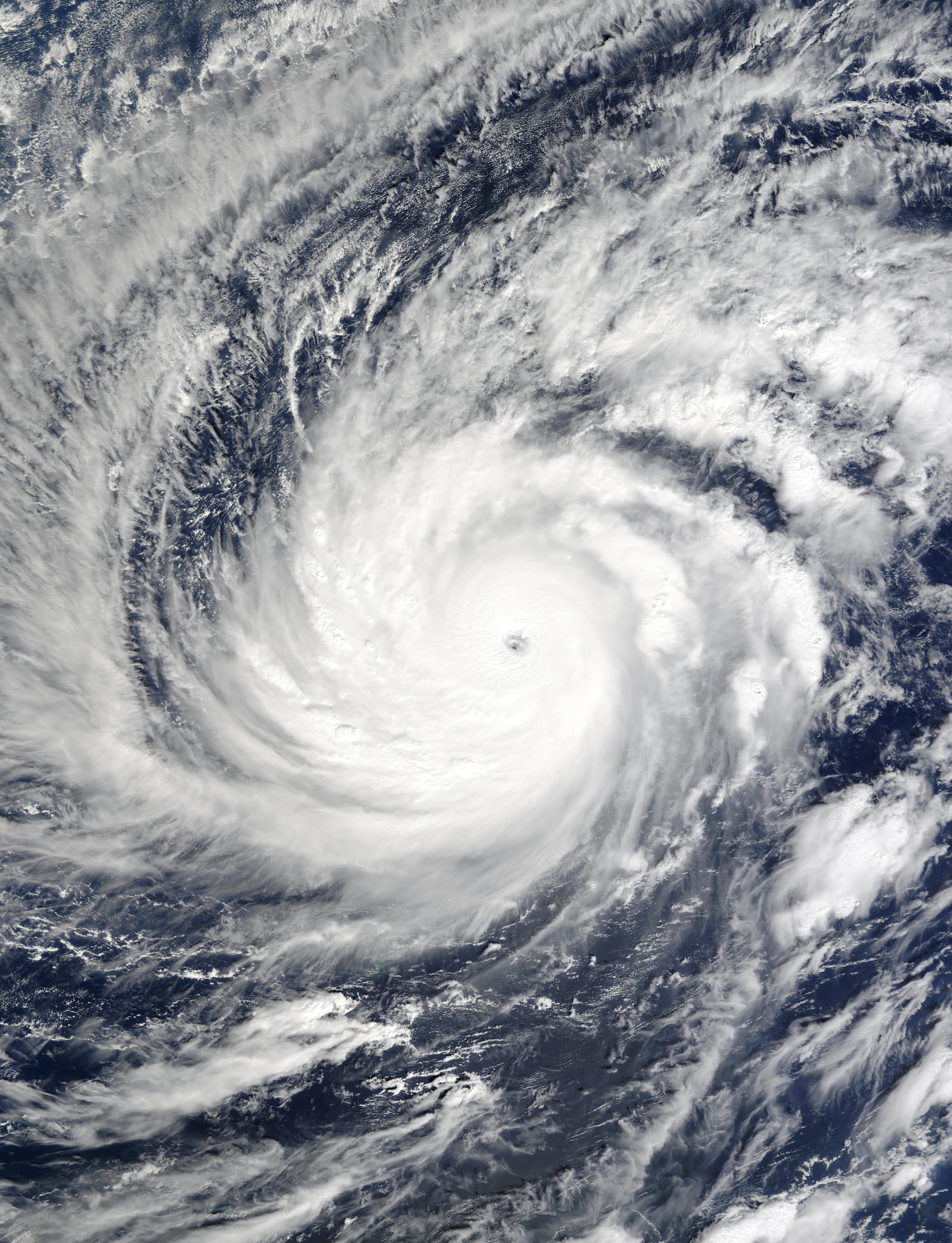
- Duration: November 18 – December 2
- Peak intensity: 185 km/h (115 mph) (10-min); 915 hPa (mbar)

Typhoon Lupit formed on November 18 from the monsoon trough to the west of the Marshall Islands. Early in its duration, it moved generally to the west or west-southwest. On November 21, the depression intensified into Tropical Storm Lupit, and two days later, it strengthened into a typhoon, developing an eye. Lupit later began a prolonged movement to the northwest, during which it passed near several islands in Yap State. The typhoon reached peak intensity on November 26, with peak 10–minute sustained winds of 185 km/h (115 mph). It later weakened due to a variety of unfavorable conditions, and after recurving to the northeast, Lupit became extratropical south of Japan on December 2.

Typhoon Lupit first affected Pohnpei with gusty winds, and later it damaged or destroyed about 200 homes in Chuuk State. There, high waves flooded roads and homes, while high winds damaged crops. Damage was heaviest in Yap State, mostly in the small Ulithi atoll and Fais Island. On both islands, the typhoon contaminated the water supply and wrecked the crops. Rainfall reached 263 mm (10.4 in) on Ulithi, and gusts reached 158 km/h (98 mph). Throughout the FSM, damage totaled about $1.7 million, although there were no deaths. The damage prompted the FSM government to declare two states as disaster areas, as well as a disaster declaration from the United States federal government. While Lupit was becoming extratropical, it became the first typhoon in December to threaten Japan in 13 years. The storm dropped rainfall that resulted in mudslides and flight cancellations.

=== Other systems ===
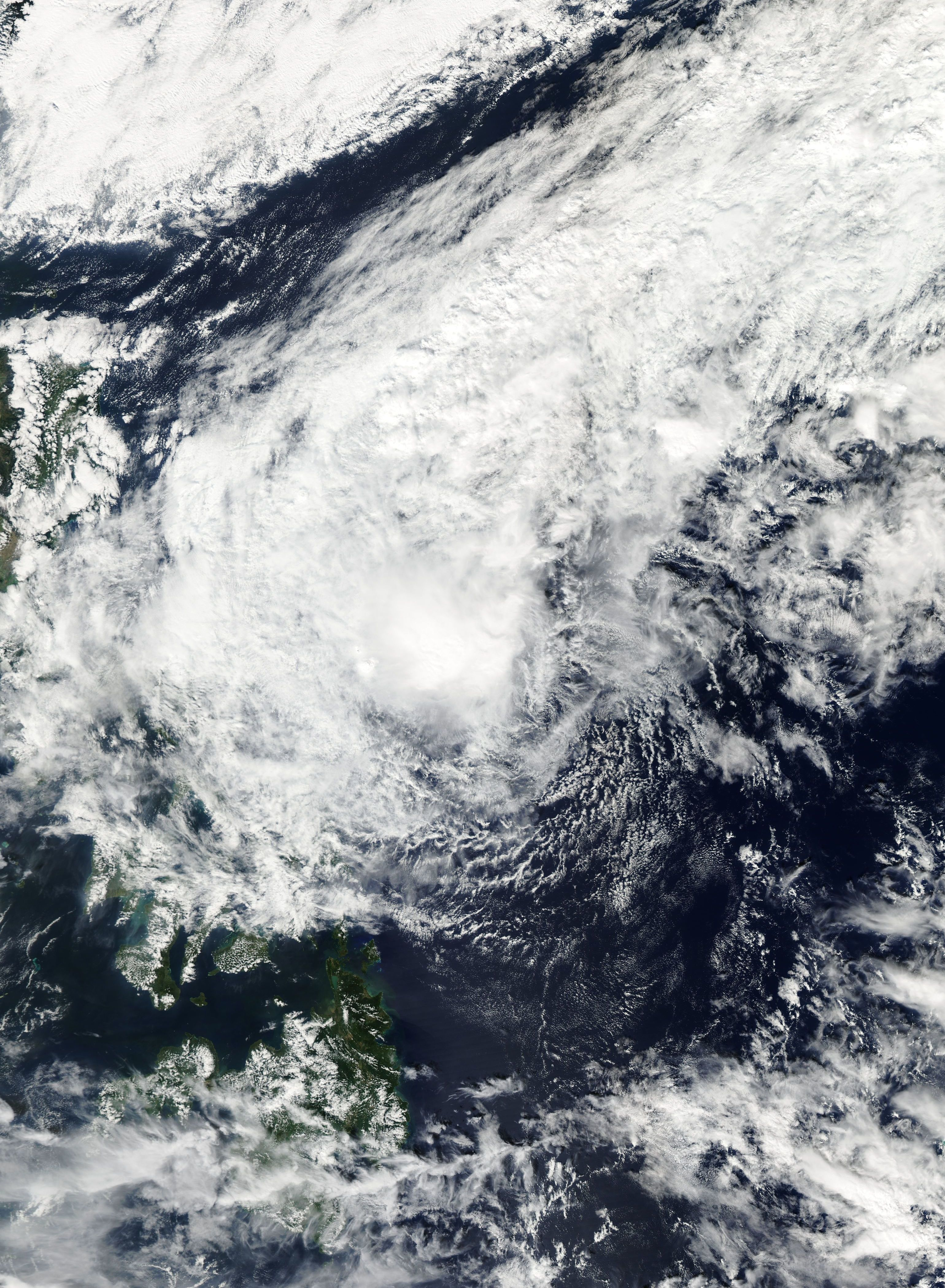
Satellite image of the final tropical depression of the year, located east of the Philippines

On May 16, an area of convection formed to the southwest of Palau, located within an area of weak wind shear. The next day, the JMA and the JTWC both classified the system as a tropical depression. The convection was disorganized in association with multiple circulation centers, although it gradually organized. Moving westward initially, the depression turned more to the north into an area of increasing wind shear. On May 19, the JTWC upgraded the system to Tropical Storm 03W, and on the same day, PAGASA classified it as Tropical Depression Batibot. Soon after, the convection decreased from the center, and by May 20, all warning agencies had discontinued advisories.

On July 9, PAGASA classified a system as Tropical Depression Falcon, off the west coast of the Philippines. The JMA also briefly initiated advisories before dropping them later on July 10. On July 30, PAGASA briefly issued advisories on Tropical Depression Ineng off the east coast of Mindanao.

The monsoon trough spawned a tropical depression north of Luzon on August 18, with PAGASA naming it Lakay. There were several circulations in the region, with Tropical Storm Vamco to the northeast near Taiwan, and the overall system moved generally westward. PAGASA briefly classified Lakay as a tropical storm on August 19 before ending advisories the next day. The system spread rainfall across China, reaching 82.4 mm (3.24 in) in Xiamen, Fujuan.

On September 5, former Hurricane Jimena crossed the International Date Line into the basin. By that time, the circulation was largely exposed from the convection, and the center quickly dissipated. Later in September, the monsoon trough spawned a disturbance east of the Philippines that PAGASA classified as Tropical Depression Quiel on September 15. The system moved westward but never intensified, dissipating west of Luzon on September 19. The broad system also spawned Typhoon Choi-wan.

On October 5, the JMA monitored a tropical depression southeast of Taiwan that later passed near the island, producing heavy rainfall that peaked at 153 mm (6.0 in) in Ilan County. On October 6, the JTWC classified Tropical Depression 18W early in the month off the west coast of Luzon. With weak steering currents, the system moved slowly southwestward before looping to the northwest. On October 10, the depression dissipated just off the coast of southern China. On October 16, the JMA briefly classified a tropical depression to the east of the Marianas Islands. On October 21, a monsoon trough spawned a tropical depression in the Gulf of Thailand, which moved northwestward and crossed into the Indian Ocean, dropping heavy rainfall in Thailand.

In mid-November, the JMA briefly tracked a weak tropical depression near Wake Island. The agency also briefly tracked a tropical depression off the coast of Vietnam on December 16. It finally dissipated on December 17, with the pressure and winds unknown. The final system of the year was a tropical depression that originated out of the monsoon trough on December 24 east of the Philippines. After initially moving to the west, it turned to the south, and the JTWC estimated the depression intensified into a tropical storm. During this time, PAGASA classified it as Tropical Storm Zigzag. The system made landfall in northeastern Mindanao and dissipated on December 27, bringing heavy rainfall.

== Storm names ==
Within the North-western Pacific Ocean, both the Japan Meteorological Agency (JMA) and the Philippine Atmospheric, Geophysical and Astronomical Services Administration assign names to tropical cyclones that develop in the Western Pacific, which can result in a tropical cyclone having two names. The Japan Meteorological Agency's RSMC Tokyo — Typhoon Center assigns international names to tropical cyclones on behalf of the World Meteorological Organization's Typhoon Committee, should they be judged to have 10-minute sustained windspeeds of 65 km/h (40 mph). While the Philippine Atmospheric, Geophysical and Astronomical Services Administration assigns names to tropical cyclones which move into or form as a tropical depression in their area of responsibility located between 135°E and 115°E and between 5°N-25°N even if the cyclone has had an international name assigned to it. The names of significant tropical cyclones are retired, by both PAGASA and the Typhoon Committee.

=== International names ===
| Yanyan | Kujira | Chan-hom | Linfa | Nangka | Soudelor | Imbudo | Koni | Morakot | Etau | Vamco |
| Krovanh | Dujuan | Maemi | Choi-wan | Koppu | Ketsana | Parma | Melor | Nepartak | Lupit | |

=== Philippines ===
| Amang | Batibot | Chedeng | Dodong | Egay | Falcon | Gilas | Harurot | Ineng | Juaning | Kabayan | Lakay | Manang |
| Niña | Onyok | Pogi | Quiel | Roskas | Sikat | Tisoy | Ursula | Viring | Weng | Yoyoy | Zigzag | |

=== Retirement ===
Following the season, the names Imbudo and Maemi were retired, and replaced by Molave and Mujigae, respectively. Hong Kong requested the removal of Yanyan, to be replaced by Dolphin. The name Koni had its spelling corrected to Goni. PAGASA retired the name Harurot from their naming lists, replacing it with Hanna.

== Season effects ==
The following table provides basic meteorological and impact information for each tropical cyclone from the 2003 Pacific typhoon season in tabular format; unnamed tropical cyclones are not included. PAGASA names for storms are provided in parentheses. Storms entering from the Central Pacific only include their information while in the western Pacific, and are noted with an asterisk *.

| Name | Dates | Peak intensity | | | Areas affected | Damage (USD) | Deaths | Ref(s). |
| Name | Dates | Category | Wind speed | Pressure | Areas affected | Damage (USD) | Deaths | Ref(s). |
|---|---|---|---|---|---|---|---|---|
| Yanyan | January 15 – 20 | Tropical storm | 65 km/h (40 mph) | 1000 hPa (29.53 inHg) | None affected | None | None | |
| Kujira (Amang) | April 10 – 25 | Very strong typhoon | 165 km/h (105 mph) | 930 hPa (27.47 inHg) | Micronesia, Philippines, Taiwan, Japan | $230,000 | 3 | |
| TD | May 17 | Tropical depression | Not specified | 1008 hPa (29.77 inHg) | Philippines | None | None | |
| 03W (Batibot) | May 18 – 21 | Tropical depression | Not specified | 1004 hPa (29.65 inHg) | Philippines | None | None | |
| TD | May 19 | Tropical depression | Not specified | 1008 hPa (29.77 inHg) | None affected | None | None | |
| Chan-hom | May 19 – 27 | Very strong typhoon | 155 km/h (100 mph) | 940 hPa (27.76 inHg) | Chuuk, Guam | $16 million | None | |
| Linfa (Chedeng) | May 25 – 30 | Severe tropical storm | 100 km/h (65 mph) | 980 hPa (28.94 inHg) | Philippines, Japan | $28.2 million | 41 | |
| Nangka (Dodong) | May 30 – June 3 | Severe tropical storm | 95 km/h (60 mph) | 985 hPa (29.09 inHg) | Taiwan, Philippines, Japan | None | None | |
| Soudelor (Egay) | June 12 – 19 | Strong typhoon | 150 km/h (90 mph) | 955 hPa (28.20 inHg) | Philippines, Taiwan, Japan, South Korea | $15.3 million | 14 | |
| Falcon | July 9 – 10 | Tropical depression | 55 km/h (35 mph) | 1004 hPa (29.65 inHg) | None affected | None | None | |
| Koni (Gilas) | July 15 – 22 | Severe tropical storm | 110 km/h (70 mph) | 975 hPa (28.79 inHg) | Philippines, China, Vietnam | $16.9 million | 7 | |
| Imbudo (Harurot) | July 15 – 25 | Very strong typhoon | 165 km/h (105 mph) | 935 hPa (27.61 inHg) | Philippines, China | $383 million | 85 | |
| Ineng | July 30 – 31 | Tropical depression | 45 km/h (30 mph) | 1004 hPa (29.65 inHg) | Philippines | Minimal | None | |
| Morakot (Juaning) | July 31 – August 4 | Tropical storm | 85 km/h (50 mph) | 992 hPa (29.29 inHg) | Taiwan, China | $31 million | 3 | |
| TD | August 2 – 6 | Tropical depression | Not specified | 1008 hPa (29.77 inHg) | None affected | None | None | |
| Etau (Kabayan) | August 2 – 9 | Very strong typhoon | 155 km/h (100 mph) | 945 hPa (27.91 inHg) | Palau, Guam, Okinawa, Japan | $825 million | 20 | |
| Krovanh (Niña) | August 16 – 26 | Strong typhoon | 120 km/h (75 mph) | 970 hPa (28.65 inHg) | Philippines, China, Vietnam | $253 million | 4 | |
| TD | August 17 | Tropical depression | Not specified | 1004 hPa (29.65 inHg) | Philippines | None | None | |
| Vamco (Manang) | August 18 – 20 | Tropical storm | 65 km/h (40 mph) | 996 hPa (29.41 inHg) | Philippines, Taiwan, China | $4.7 million | None | |
| Lakay | August 18 – 20 | Tropical depression | 55 km/h (35 mph) | 996 hPa (29.41 inHg) | Philippines, Taiwan, China | None | None | |
| TD | August 18 – 19 | Tropical depression | Not specified | 1008 hPa (29.77 inHg) | None affected | None | None | |
| TD | August 26 – 27 | Tropical depression | Not specified | 1008 hPa (29.77 inHg) | None affected | None | None | |
| Dujuan (Onyok) | August 27 – September 3 | Strong typhoon | 150 km/h (90 mph) | 950 hPa (28.05 inHg) | Philippines, Okinawa, Taiwan, China | $392 million | 44 | |
| TD | August 31 – September 3 | Tropical depression | Not specified | 1008 hPa (29.77 inHg) | None affected | None | None | |
| Maemi (Pogi) | September 4 – 13 | Violent typhoon | 195 km/h (120 mph) | 910 hPa (26.87 inHg) | Japan, South Korea, North Korea | $4.8 billion | 120 | |
| TD | September 7 – 8 | Tropical depression | Not specified | 1002 hPa (29.59 inHg) | Vietnam | None | None | |
| TD | September 11 – 13 | Tropical depression | Not specified | 1010 hPa (29.83 inHg) | None affected | None | None | |
| TD | September 14 – 15 | Tropical depression | Not specified | 1004 hPa (29.59 inHg) | South China | None | None | |
| Quiel | September 15 – 19 | Tropical depression | 55 km/h (35 mph) | 1000 hPa (29.53 inHg) | Philippines | None | None | |
| Choi-wan (Roskas) | September 16 – 24 | Strong typhoon | 130 km/h (85 mph) | 955 hPa (28.20 inHg) | Japan | $2.5 million | None | |
| Koppu (Sikat) | September 23 – 30 | Strong typhoon | 130 km/h (85 mph) | 960 hPa (28.35 inHg) | None affected | None | None | |
| TD | October 5 – 6 | Tropical depression | Not specified | 1008 hPa (29.77 inHg) | Taiwan | None | None | |
| 18W | October 6 – 10 | Tropical depression | 55 km/h (35 mph) | 1004 hPa (29.65 inHg) | South China | None | None | |
| 19W | October 12 – 13 | Tropical depression | Not specified | Not specified | South China | None | 2 | |
| TD | October 16 | Tropical depression | Not specified | 1004 hPa (29.65 inHg) | None affected | None | None | |
| Ketsana (Tisoy) | October 17 – 26 | Very strong typhoon | 165 km/h (105 mph) | 940 hPa (27.76 inHg) | None affected | None | None | |
| Parma | October 19 – 31 | Very strong typhoon | 175 km/h (110 mph) | 930 hPa (27.47 inHg) | None affected | None | None | |
| 23W | October 21 – 23 | Tropical depression | 55 km/h (35 mph) | 1008 hPa (29.77 inHg) | Thailand | Minor | 1 | |
| 22W (Ursula) | October 21 – 23 | Tropical depression | 55 km/h (35 mph) | 1004 hPa (29.65 inHg) | Philippines | Minor | 1 | |
| Melor (Viring) | October 29 – November 5 | Severe tropical storm | 95 km/h (60 mph) | 980 hPa (28.94 inHg) | Philippines, Taiwan, Japan | None | 4 | |
| Nepartak (Weng) | November 11 – 19 | Strong typhoon | 120 km/h (75 mph) | 970 hPa (28.65 inHg) | Philippines, Vietnam, China | $197 million | 4 | |
| TD | November 14 – 15 | Tropical depression | Not specified | 1004 hPa (29.65 inHg) | None affected | None | None | |
| TD | November 15 | Tropical depression | Not specified | 1004 hPa (29.65 inHg) | None affected | None | None | |
| Lupit (Yoyoy) | November 18 – December 2 | Very strong typhoon | 185 km/h (115 mph) | 915 hPa (27.02 inHg) | Micronesia, Japan | $1.7 million | None | |
| TD | December 16 – 17 | Tropical depression | Not specified | 1004 hPa (29.65 inHg) | None affected | None | None | |
| 27W (Zigzag) | December 23 – 27 | Tropical depression | 55 km/h (35 mph) | 1002 hPa (29.59 inHg) | Philippines | None | None | |
Season aggregates
| 45 systems | January 15 – December 27, 2003 | | 195 km/h (120 mph) | 910 hPa (26.87 inHg) | | $6.97 billion | 351 | |

== See also ==
- Tropical cyclones in 2003
- Pacific typhoon season
- 2003 Atlantic hurricane season
- 2003 Pacific hurricane season
- 2003 North Indian Ocean cyclone season
- South-West Indian Ocean cyclone seasons: 2002–03, 2003–04
- Australian region cyclone seasons: 2002–03, 2003–04
- South Pacific cyclone seasons: 2002–03, 2003–04
