= Cilla (disambiguation) =

Cilla is a feminine given name.

Cilla may also refer to:

== Associated with British singer Cilla Black ==
- Cilla (album), by Black
- Cilla (1968 TV series), a 1968–1976 variety show hosted by Black
- Cilla (2014 TV series), a 2014 TV drama about Black
  - Cilla The Musical, a 2017 stage adaptation of the TV drama

== Other meanings ==
- Cilla (moth), synonym of the moth genus Gabara
- Tropical Cyclone Cilla, January 2003
- 8744 Cilla, a main-belt asteroid
- Cilla (city), a town mentioned by Homer in the Iliad

== See also ==
- Cila (disambiguation)
- Zilla (disambiguation)
