= Gojira =

Gojira (ゴジラ) is the original Japanese name for Godzilla, a fictional kaiju character.

Gojira may refer to:

== Films ==
- Godzilla (1954 film), 1954 film released as Gojira (ゴジラ) in Japan
- The Return of Godzilla, 1984 film released as Gojira (ゴジラ) in Japan
- Godzilla (1998 film), 1998 film released as Gojira (ゴジラ) in Japan
- Godzilla (2014 film), 2014 film released as Gojira (ゴジラ) in Japan
- Shin Godzilla, 2016 film released as Shin Gojira (シン・ゴジラ) in Japan
- Godzilla Minus One, 2023 film released as Gojira Mainasu Wan (ゴジラ・マイナス・ワン) in Japan

== Other uses ==
- Godzilla (franchise), the multimedia franchise spawned from Godzilla known as Gojira (ゴジラ) in Japan
- Gojira (band), a French heavy metal band
- 101781 Gojira, an asteroid
- Gojirasaurus, the "Godzilla lizard", a Triassic-period dinosaur
- Gojiro, a 1991 novel by Mark Jacobson
- MV Gojira, the original name of the MV Brigitte Bardot
- A nickname given to Japanese baseball player Hideki Matsui
- Jira (software), a software product developed by Atlassian

== See also ==
- Godzilla (disambiguation)
- Gojra, a city in Toba Tek Singh District, Punjab, Pakistan
- Gojra, Mandi Bahauddin, a village in Mandi Bahauddin District, Punjab, Pakistan
- Sajra and Gojra Forts, forts in Tamil Nadu, India
