= CILA =

Abbreviation CILA may refer to:

- Centre for International Light Art
- CILA, the Mexican section of the International Boundary and Water Commission (Spanish: Comisión Internacional de Límites y Aguas)
- CILA-FM, a Catholic radio station in Quebec

== See also ==
- Cila (disambiguation)
