= Godzilla (disambiguation) =

Godzilla (ゴジラ, Gojira) is a giant monster originating from the series of Japanese and American films and other media.

Godzilla may also refer to:

== Other versions of the character ==
- Godzilla (Shōwa)
- Godzilla (Heisei)
- Godzilla (TriStar)
- Godzilla (Monsterverse)
- Shin Godzilla (character)
- Godzilla (Takashi Yamazaki)

== Film ==
- Godzilla (1954 film), a 1954 film produced by Toho Co. Ltd. and the first film in the Godzilla franchise
  - "Godzilla (Main Theme)", a musical theme composed for the 1954 film
- The Return of Godzilla, released in Japan as Godzilla, 1984 film produced by Toho Co. Ltd and the sixteenth film in the franchise
- Godzilla (1998 film), 1998 film produced by TriStar Pictures and the twenty-third film in the franchise
- Godzilla (2014 film), 2014 film produced by Legendary Pictures and the thirtieth film in the franchise

== Television ==
- Godzilla (1978 TV series), a 1978–1979 American animated television series from Hanna-Barbera that aired on NBC
- Godzilla Island, a 1997–1998 Japanese children's television series
- Godzilla: The Series, a 1998–2000 American-Japanese animated television series that aired on Fox Kids

== Video games and pinball ==
- Godzilla video games
  - Godzilla (1983 video game)
  - Godzilla (Game Boy), a 1990 video game for the Game Boy
  - Godzilla (2014 video game)
  - Godzilla (pinball)

== Literature ==
- Godzilla & Godzilla Raids Again (Shigeru Kayama novels), two novellas published in 1955 by Shigeru Kayama, the same science-fiction writer who wrote the screenplays for Godzilla (1954 film) and Godzilla Raids Again (1955 film).
- Godzilla (comic), since the 1950s, comic books based on the films
- Godzilla (Scott Ciencin series), starting in 1996, a series of children's novels
- Godzilla (Marc Cerasini series), starting in 1996, a series of novels based on the film characters

== Geography ==
- Godzilla Rock (Oga), a natural creation in Oga, Akita, Japan
- Godzilla Rock (Suzu), a natural creation in Suzu, Ishikawa, Japan
- Godzilla Rock (Shari), a natural creation in Shari, Hokkaido, Japan
- Godzilla Rock (Ōshima, Tokyo), a natural creation in Izu Ōshima, Japan

== Music ==
- "Godzilla" (Blue Öyster Cult song), 1977
- ”Godzilla”, a song by Michael Sembello from his 1983 album Bossa Nova Hotel
- "Godzilla" (Eminem and Juice Wrld song), 2020
- "Godzilla!", a 2003 song by The Creatures
- "Godzilla", a song by The Doubleclicks from their 2014 album Dimetrodon
- "Godzilla", a song by Feeder from their 2002 album Comfort in Sound
- "Godzilla", a song by Kesha from her 2017 album Rainbow
- Gojira (band), a French heavy metal band formerly known as Godzilla
- Godzilla, a 1997 EP by Fu Manchu
- Godzilla (Yukmouth album), a 2003 album by Yukmouth
- Godzilla (The Veronicas album), a 2021 album by the Veronicas
- Godzilla Entertainment, a 2003 record label founded by rapper Yukmouth
- Godzilla (singer) (1988–2019), Tanzanian singer

== Automotive ==
- Nissan Skyline GT-R and Nissan GT-R, two Japanese sports cars nicknamed "Godzilla"
- Ford Godzilla engine, a V8 engine offered by the Ford Motor Company

== Other uses ==
- Godzilla (franchise), the multimedia franchise as a whole spawned from Godzilla
- Dakosaurus andiniensis, an extinct species of marine crocodilian
- Godzillus robustus, a species of remiped discovered by Frederick Schram et al.
- Gojirasaurus, a dinosaur from the Triassic period
- Godzilla, a ligase of endosomes of Drosophila.
- Godzilla, a large storm that brought masses of dust from the Sahara to the Caribbean basin during COVID-19 pandemic.
- Godzilla Asian American Arts Network
- Godzillatron, a scoreboard at the University of Texas
- Godzilla Game, a 1978 Mattel board game
- Godzilla, a fictional monster in the online game Rappelz
- Hideki Matsui, a baseball player with the popular nickname "Godzilla"
- Godzilla, name given by marine geologists to a hydrothermal vent in the Pacific
- Godzilla Star, a Luminous blue variable (LBV) star in the Sunburst galaxy, currently the most luminous known star.

== See also ==
- Gojira (disambiguation)
- Zilla (disambiguation)
