= Cila =

Cila may refer to:

- Čilá, a village in the Plzeň region of the Czech Republic
- CILA-FM, a Catholic radio station in Quebec
- Jordan Cila (born 1982), American soccer player, played for various American clubs
- Renato Cila (born 1951), Brazilian soccer player, played for Corinthians, Atlético Madrid, and various North American clubs

== See also ==
- CILA (disambiguation)
- Cilla
- Sila (disambiguation)
