= New Godzilla =

New Godzilla may refer to:

- Godzilla (Heisei)
- Shin Godzilla

== See also ==
- Godzilla (disambiguation)
