= Zillah =

Zillah may refer to:

== Geography ==
- Zillah (country subdivision), a country subdivision in Bangladesh, India and Pakistan
- Zillah, Washington, United States, a city

== People ==
- Zillah Smith Gill (1859–1937), New Zealand local politician and community leader
- Cecilia "Zillah" Andrén, winner of Talang 2007, a Sweden TV talent show – see Zillah & Totte
- Zillah Minx, a member of Rubella Ballet, a gothic anarcho-punk band

== Fictional characters ==
- Zillah, a vampire from Lost Souls, by Poppy Z Brite
- Zillah, the wife of Abel in Cain, by Lord Byron
- Zillah, from Flora Thompson's Lark Rise to Candleford
- Zillah, from Wuthering Heights, a novel by Emily Brontë
- Zillah, a Native American princess in A Swiftly Tilting Planet, the fourth book of Madeleine L'Engle's Time Quintet
- Zillah, 1865 operetta by Australian composer William Wilkins Russell

== Other uses ==
- Zillah (biblical figure), a wife of Lamech, a descendant of Cain
- USS Zillah (SP-2804), a patrol vessel that served in the United States Navy in 1918
- Zilla, a 19th-century wooden steamboat – see Miztec (schooner barge)
- Zillah High School, Zillah, Washington

== See also ==
- Zilla (disambiguation)
- Zella, Libya, a town in north-central Libya
