= Cyclone Erica =

Category 5 South Pacific and Australian region cyclone in 2003

Severe Tropical Cyclone Erica
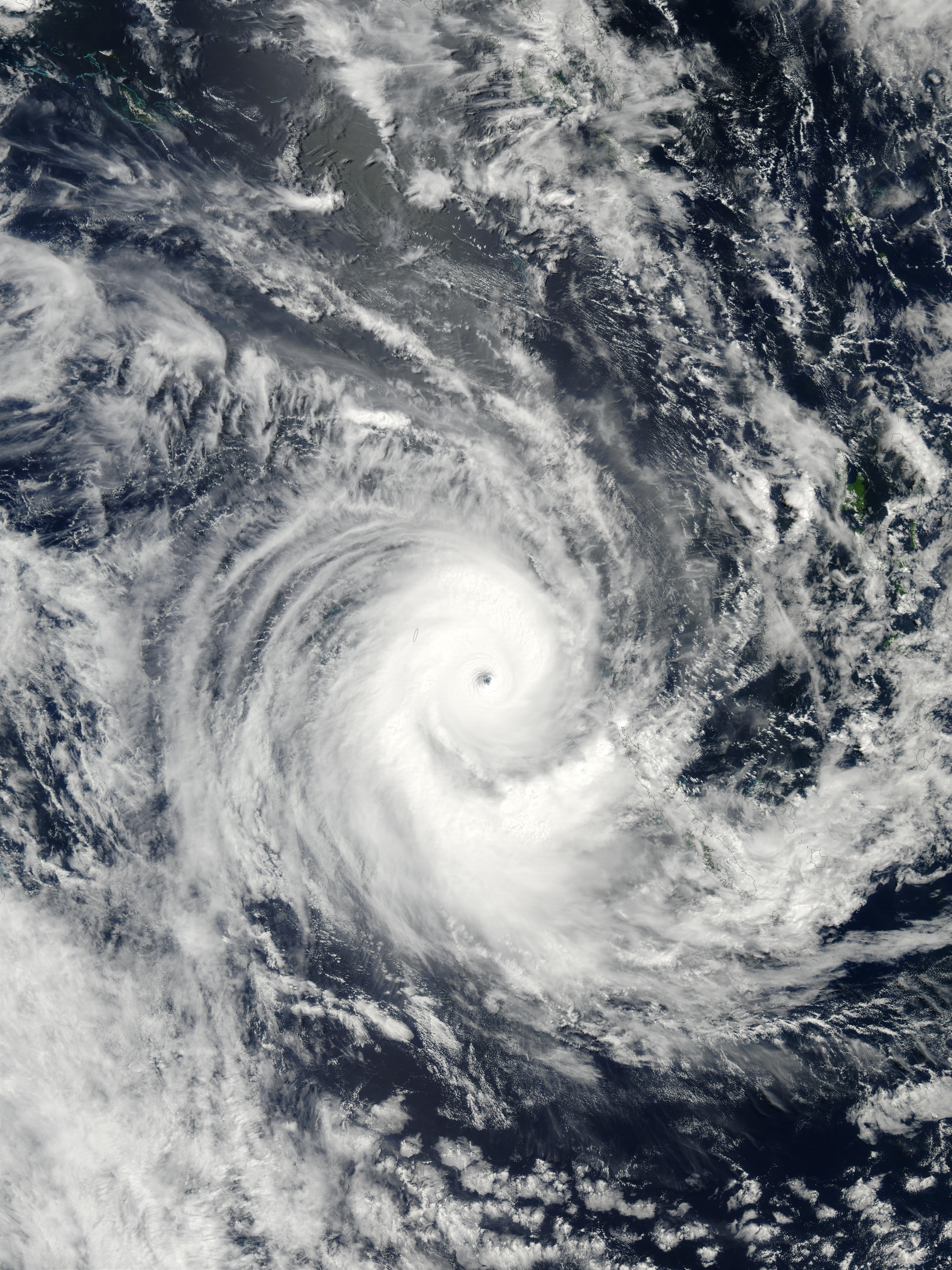
- Cyclone Erica near its peak intensity on March 13, northwest of New Caledonia

Meteorological history
- Formed: 1 March 2003
- Extratropical: 15 March
- Dissipated: 17 March 2003

Category 5 severe tropical cyclone
- 10-minute sustained (FMS)
- Highest winds: 215 km/h (130 mph)
- Lowest pressure: 915 hPa (mbar); 27.02 inHg

Category 4-equivalent tropical cyclone
- 1-minute sustained (SSHWS/JTWC)
- Highest winds: 240 km/h (150 mph)
- Lowest pressure: 910 hPa (mbar); 26.87 inHg

Overall effects
- Fatalities: 2 total
- Damage: $15 million (2003 USD)
- Areas affected: Queensland, Southeast Papua New Guinea, Solomon Islands, New Caledonia
- IBTrACS
- Part of the 2002–03 Australian region and South Pacific cyclone seasons

Severe Tropical Cyclone Erica of March 2003 was a powerful cyclone that severely affected New Caledonia and was considered the worst to affect it since Cyclone Beti. The system was the eighth cyclone and the fifth severe tropical cyclone of the 2002–03 South Pacific cyclone season. Cyclone Erica developed from a monsoonal trough on 4 March just off Queensland. Originally, the storm moved slowly towards the east and then north early in its existence. However, increasing wind shear caused the storm to be degenerated into a tropical low. After conditions once again became more favorable for development, the remnants regenerated into a tropical cyclone on 10 March. Steadily intensifying, Erica reached peak intensity on 13 March as a Category 5 equivalent on the Australian intensity scale.

On the same day Erica paralleled the coast of New Caledonia before making landfall on the southern end of the island at L'Île-des-Pins. However, at the same time the cyclone also entered an area with strong wind shear and thus began to weaken. After passing the island, an extratropical transition begun, weakening the cyclone as it moved towards the southeast. On 15 March, Erica completed its transition into an extratropical cyclone and later fully dissipated two days later.

Cyclone Erica severely impacted the island nation of New Caledonia, causing intense winds and heavy rain. An estimated 892 families were affected by the cyclone on the island, and two people were killed. As many as 60% of people on the west coast lost power. On 17 March only 17 of the 66 secondary schools on the island were functioning. After the storm it was feared that the existing dengue fever epidemic on the island would spread. Erica caused $15 million (2003 USD) in damages, primarily on New Caledonia. Following the deaths and damage, the name "Erica" was later retired.

== Meteorological history ==
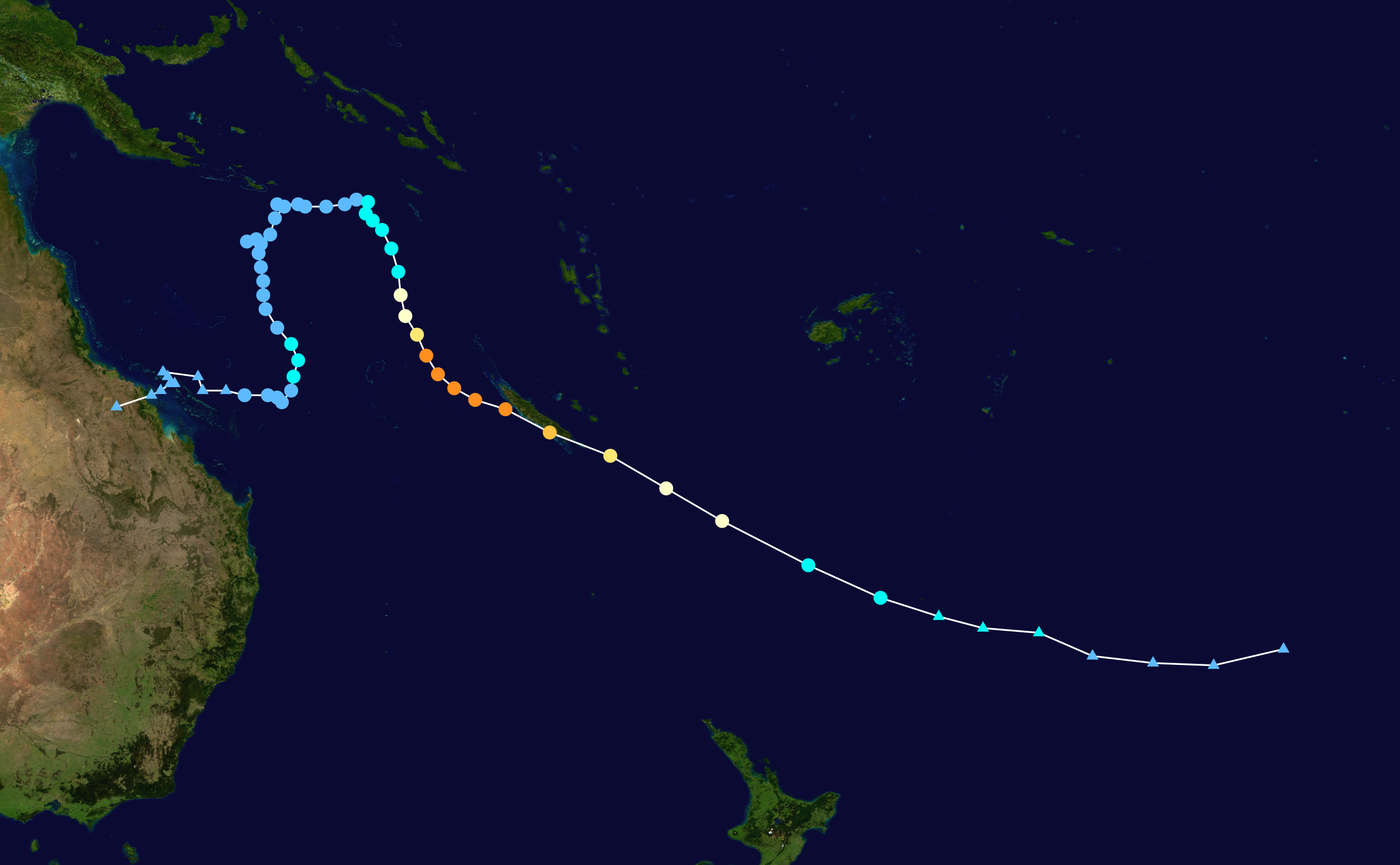
Map plotting the storm's track and intensity, according to the Saffir–Simpson scale Map key Saffir–Simpson scale Tropical depression (≤38 mph, ≤62 km/h) Tropical storm (39–73 mph, 63–118 km/h) Category 1 (74–95 mph, 119–153 km/h) Category 2 (96–110 mph, 154–177 km/h) Category 3 (111–129 mph, 178–208 km/h) Category 4 (130–156 mph, 209–251 km/h) Category 5 (≥157 mph, ≥252 km/h) Unknown Storm type Tropical cyclone Subtropical cyclone Extratropical cyclone, remnant low, tropical disturbance, or monsoon depression

The precursor to Cyclone Erica was an area of low pressure that formed within a monsoon trough north of the Tiwi Islands on 13 February 2003. This low moved into the Joseph Bonaparte Gulf and then ashore Mainland Australia near the border between Western Australia and Northern Territory on 15 February. It remained over the continent for the latter half of February, taking a track south of Alice Springs, Northern Territory, and then towards Queensland. Now taking an eastward trajectory, the centre of the low emerged into the Coral Sea near the Whitsunday Islands on 3 March. Data from the QuikSCAT satellite showed a center of circulation well-removed from the nearest area of strong winds and rain. However, the abating of wind shear resulted in an increase in the system's organisation with convective activity and the system's circulation becoming better developed. At 06:00 UTC on 4 March, the system was designated as Tropical Cyclone Erica by the Tropical Cyclone Warning Centre in Brisbane, Australia (TCWC-Brisbane); it was TCWC-Brisbane's first named system of the 2002–03 Australian region cyclone season. At the time, Erica was located 790 km (490 mi) east-southeast of Townsville, Queensland.

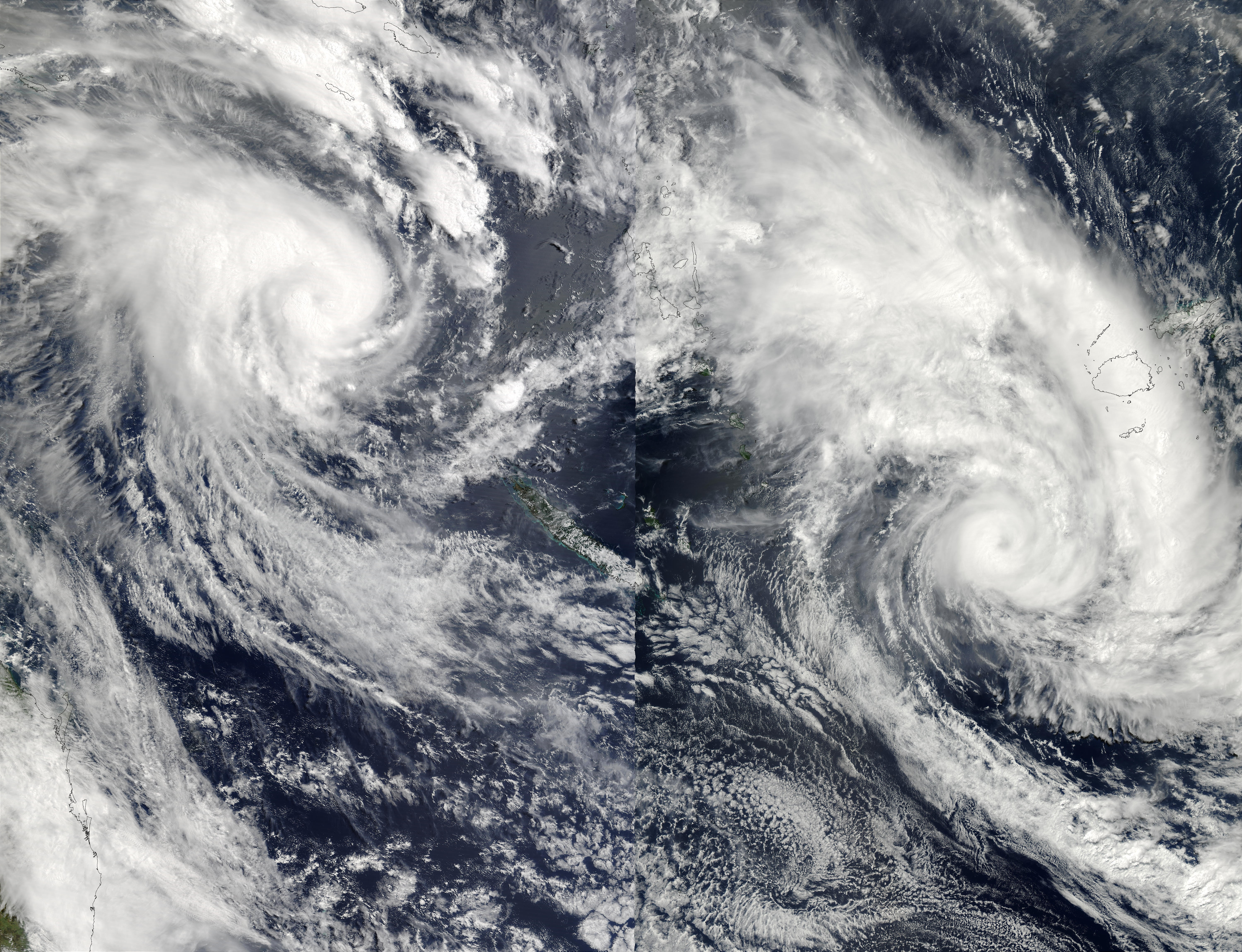
Cyclones Erica and Eseta over the southern Pacific on 11 March

Remaining under the conditions of lessened wind shear, Erica continued to strengthen after being named and attained 10-minute maximum sustained winds of 100 kilometres per hour (62 mph) at 18:00 UTC on 4 March. While Erica had initially drifted slowly eastward due to a lack of steering influences, a developing ridge of high pressure to the south and west caused the cyclone to curve towards the north. Along this trajectory, Erica once again encountered unfavorable wind shear and consequently weakened with its winds falling below gale-force by 7 March; at this phase the system was classified as a tropical depression. An intensifying monsoonal flow around the remnant circulation caused the storm to move towards the east, just south of the Solomon Islands. On 10 March, it entered an environment more conducive to tropical cyclone development, characterized by low wind shear and coincident with a favourable phase of the Madden–Julian oscillation. The organisation of the system's cloud pattern improved in response. At 18:00 UTC on 10 March, the system was redesignated as a tropical cyclone while located 370 km (230 mi) south-southwest of Honiara, Solomon Islands.

A trough in the upper-troposphere caused the reformed Erica to accelerate towards the southeast. Erica's winds reached hurricane strength at 18:00 UTC on 11 March, classifying the cyclone as a Category 3 on the Australian and Fijian cyclone scale. A day later, the cyclone exited the area of responsibility of TCWC-Brisbane and into the area of responsibility of the Fiji Meteorological Service (FMS) in Nadi, Fiji. A ragged eye began to emerge on satellite imagery with convection quickly developing around Erica's center. With low wind shear and favourable winds aloft, Erica intensified further and reached a peak intensity with sustained winds of 215 kilometres per hour (134 mph) at 06:00 UTC on 13 March while located approximately 500 km (300 mi) west-northwest of Nouméa, New Caledonia. According to the JTWC, Erica's peak 1-minute sustained winds reached 240 kilometres per hour (150 mph), though satellite intensity estimates suggested windspeeds as high as 260 kilometres per hour (160 mph). The FMS estimated that Erica's central air pressure reached a minimum of 915 hPa (mbar; 27.02 inHg). The diameter of Erica's eye shrank and decreased and the eye became symmetrical. Throughout the day, the cyclone paralleled the southwest coast of the principal island of New Caledonia before tracking across the southern end of the island and the Isle of Pines; it made landfall roughly 220 km (140 mph) northwest of Nouméa shortly after 18:00 UTC on 13 March. Prolonged interaction with New Caledonia caused the cyclone's winds to lessen. After clearing New Caledonia, a subtropical ridge to the northeast caused Erica to move into an area of increasing wind shear and accelerate into the mid-latitudes, leading to the storm weakening further and undergoing extratropical transition; this transition was completed by 12:00 UTC on 15 March. The extratropical remnants of Erica passed east of New Zealand on 16–17 March.

== Preparations, impact, and aftermath ==
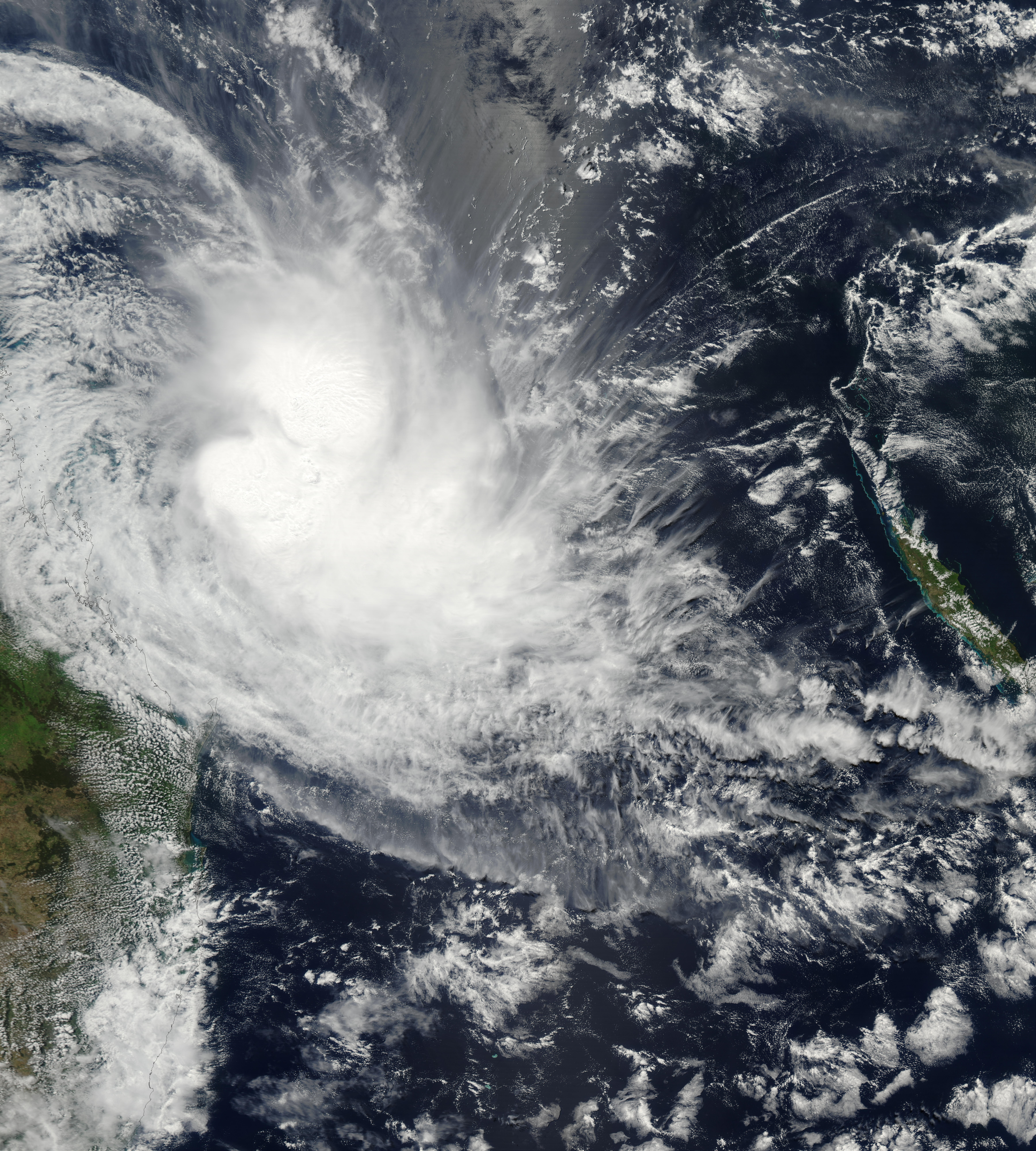
Erica on 4 March 2003

=== Australia ===
As a tropical low, Erica brought strong winds to northern Queensland. Several large trees were uprooted, one of which fell on a car in Cape Tribulation and another on a house in Port Douglas. Numerous trees were defoliated and some boats were reported to have been pulling their moorings due to the wind. Power lines were also damaged by the low.

=== New Caledonia ===
On 12 March, officials in New Caledonia issued a pre-alert as Erica was forecast to impact the territory. Evacuation centers were set up in churches and community halls. All schools throughout the island were closed and airports were shut down.

Despite the rapid weakening before landfall, Erica produced intense winds, gusting to a record 202 kilometres per hour (126 mph) in Nouméa. Ten-minute sustained winds were recorded up to 144 kilometres per hour (89 mph) around the center of the storm.

An estimated 892 families were affected by Erica, and Erica was also reported to have caused two deaths and injured 80 people. In addition 1,000 people were estimated to be homeless. Several communication lines were severed, and tribes and farms were devastated. 20% of electricity customers in Nouméa were without power, and 60% of customers on the main island's west coast were also without power. In Yaté, police assessed that half of the population was without shelter, and in Pohé, it was estimated that 90% of the crops were destroyed by Erica. On 17 March 2003, only 17 of the 66 secondary schools in New Caledonia were functioning, with others still closed primarily due to safety concerns. The University of New Caledonia was also badly damaged. However, all primary schools were functioning.

South Province, New Caledonia formed an emergency committee following the storm, led by Jacques Lafleur. The committee assisted in filing damage claims caused by the cyclone. After the storm, 60 French specialists were sent to New Caledonia to help in rebuilding areas hit hard by Erica. Ministry of Overseas France head Brigitte Giradin arrived in Nouméa on 17 March to investigate the damage. Following the visit, Brigitte Giradin announced that US$17 million would be sent to rebuild 1,000 homes on the island nation, including an additional US$500,000 in disaster relief to the island country. A transport aircraft stationed in Tahiti brought 1.5 short tons (1,400 kg) of emergency supplies.

Following Erica's heavy rains, it was feared that the already existing dengue fever epidemic would become more widespread. Prior to Erica, there were already 437 cases of dengue fever in 2003 alone. The risk for leptospirosis was also increased by Erica. High winds and strong rains resulted in damages of at least US$15 million, particularly to schools. Two fatalities total were reported as a result of Erica. The name Erica was retired after the season.

== See also ==
- Tropical cyclones in 2003
- Weather of 2003
- Cyclone Beni
- Cyclone Ivy
