= Zilla =

Zilla may refer to:

== People ==
- Zilla (rapper), formerly VZilla, stage name of underground rapper and producer Victor Gurrola Jr. (fl. 1999–present)
- Vittore Zanetti Zilla (1864–1946), Italian painter
- Zilla Mays (1931–1995), American R&B, gospel singer and pioneering DJ
- Zilla Fatu (born 1999), American professional wrestler
- Z. Mann Zilla (born 1976), American rapper and artist

== Arts and entertainment ==
- Zilla (Godzilla), a fictional film monster
- Zilla (band), a trance band started in 2004
- Willy Zilla, protagonist of My Dad the Rock Star, a Canadian/French animated TV series
- Zilla, the major antagonist in the video game Shadow Warrior

== Plants and animals ==
- Zilla (plant), a plant genus in the family Brassicaceae
- Zilla (spider), an animal genus in the family Araneidae

== Other uses ==
- Zillah (country subdivision) or Zilla, a country subdivision in Bangladesh, India and Pakistan
  - Zilla school, various schools in Bangladesh and Inida
- -zilla, a suffix derived from the fictional monster Godzilla

== See also ==
- Cilla (disambiguation)
- Zillah (disambiguation)
- Godzilla (disambiguation)
- Zillow, American tech real-estate marketplace company
