= Cilla =

Cilla is an English female given name, originally the diminutive form of Priscilla and less frequently Drusilla.

== People ==
- Cilla Black (1943–2015), English singer, actress and entertainer
- Cilla Dagan (1946–2004), Israeli singer
- Cilla Dahl Andersson (born 1971), Swedish politician
- Cilla Fisher (born 1952), ex-member of the folk music group The Singing Kettle
- Cilla McQueen (born 1949), New Zealand poet
- Cilla Naumann (born 1960), Swedish author and journalist
- Cilla Snowball (born 1958), British businessperson in advertising

== Fictional and mythological characters ==
- Cilla Battersby-Brown, a character in the British soap opera Coronation Street
- Cilla (mythology), two women associated with ancient Troy in Greek mythology

== See also ==
- Zilla (disambiguation)
