= Godzilla (1983 video game) =

1983 strategy game

- Developer: Glen Fisher
- Publisher: The Code Works
- Platform: Commodore 64
- Release: 1983
- Genre: Strategy game
- Mode: Single-player

Godzilla is a strategy game released April 1980 on Commodore PET and Commodore CBM and in 1983 for Commodore 64.

== Plot ==
Godzilla is in the oceans near Japan. The military is using all its weapons to protect Tokyo for the upcoming attack.

== Gameplay ==
Godzilla is a strategy game in which the player must command the military in an attempt to kill Godzilla before he destroys Tokyo. If Godzilla reaches Tokyo, the game is over. The game is a large grid on the map of Japan and nearby waters. The 5x5 grid contains 25 spaces (7 of which contain Japan and one containing Tokyo). Godzilla is randomly set in any of the 25 spaces except the space containing Tokyo. The player has a choice of attacking Godzilla or moving troops. The player is given a choice of attacking with a land attack, sea attack, air attack, a missile or an atom bomb. When choosing an air, land or sea attack you must choose how many troops, boats or jets you want to send out (the attack can only send out how many of the given attackers are in the grid that Godzilla is). You can also move troops and boats to different grids as opposed to attacks. After an attack it will show the number of attackers killed and how effective the attack was (e.g. following a sea attack the game will tell how many boats were sunk and how much damage was inflicted upon Godzilla). After this, Godzilla will move to another grid. If Godzilla is on land, he will go on a rampage and it will show how many civilians were killed. The atom bomb is the most powerful weapon in the game. Whenever it is used, it will destroy all life and weapons in the space dropped and the surrounding 8 spaces. If the bomb destroys Tokyo, or Godzilla reaches the city, the game is over.
