= Godzilla Game =

Board game

- Publishers: Mattel
- Publication: 1978
- Genres: Board game
- Players: 2-4
- Chance: High
- Age range: 5+
- Skills: Strategy

Godzilla Game is a board game released by Mattel in 1978. The game is a licensed-tie-in with Toho's Godzilla franchise.

The game features a pop-up Godzilla with roaring sound effects. Between two and four people could play. Each player controlled six spaceships, with twenty-four ships included in the box. One player's spaceships were all green, another's were all yellow, another's were all orange, and another's were all magenta.

== History ==
The game was released for $8.99 in 1978. The Godzilla Game was released one year after Mattel's Shogun Warriors Godzilla toy was released in 1977.

== Gameplay ==
Players attached their ships to a platform and take turns spinning a wheel. Depending on the amount of players, each player will place between two to four spaceships on the platform. Based on the number the wheel lands on, the player would move the platform that many spaces. Occasionally, the wheel would release a spring-loaded Godzilla that would eat one of the spaceships. Players can place another ship from their stockpile on the platform when its their turn and the arrow points to an empty space. The last player to have a spaceship left would be the winner.

The spaceship on the game art is labeled as "P-1", which is the same name as the spaceship in the 1965 Godzilla film Invasion of Astro-Monster.

The instructions feature an alternate quick game mode where if one of a player's ships is destroyed it has to be replaced immediately, rather than waiting for the spinner to land on an empty space.
