= Gojra, Mandi Bahauddin =

Village in Punjab, Pakistan

Gojra گوجرہ
- Village
- Location in Punjab, Pakistan Gojra (Pakistan)
- Coordinates: 32°24′18″N 73°19′09″E
- Country: Pakistan
- Province: Punjab
- District: Mandi Bahauddin
- Tehsil: Malakwal Tehsil
- Union council: UC 56 Gojra
- Time zone: UTC+5 (PST)
- Postal code: 50500

Gojra (Urdu: گوجرہ) is a village and the seat of a union council (UC 56 Gojra) in Malakwal Tehsil of Mandi Bahauddin District in the Punjab province of Pakistan. It lies on the Sargodha–Gujrat Road, which serves as the main route linking the village to the surrounding region.

== Geography ==
Gojra is situated in the central Punjab plains within the Chaj Doab, the tract of land between the Jhelum and Chenab rivers. The village lies approximately 25 kilometres (16 mi) from the district headquarters at Mandi Bahauddin and 20 kilometres (12 mi) from Malakwal, the tehsil headquarters. The Salam Interchange on the M-2 motorway is approximately 30 kilometres (19 mi) away.

Neighbouring villages include Khai, which lies on the same Sargodha–Gujrat Road route, and Chak No. 16 (Kararriwala), about 6 kilometres (3.7 mi) from Gojra.

== Administration ==
Under the local government system, Gojra forms Union Council No. 56 within Malakwal Tehsil, one of 17 union councils that make up the tehsil. Malakwal Tehsil itself is one of three tehsils, alongside Mandi Bahauddin Tehsil and Phalia Tehsil, that constitute Mandi Bahauddin District. It was carved out of Gujrat District and given district status in 1993.
