= 2002–03 South Pacific cyclone season =

Tropical cyclone season

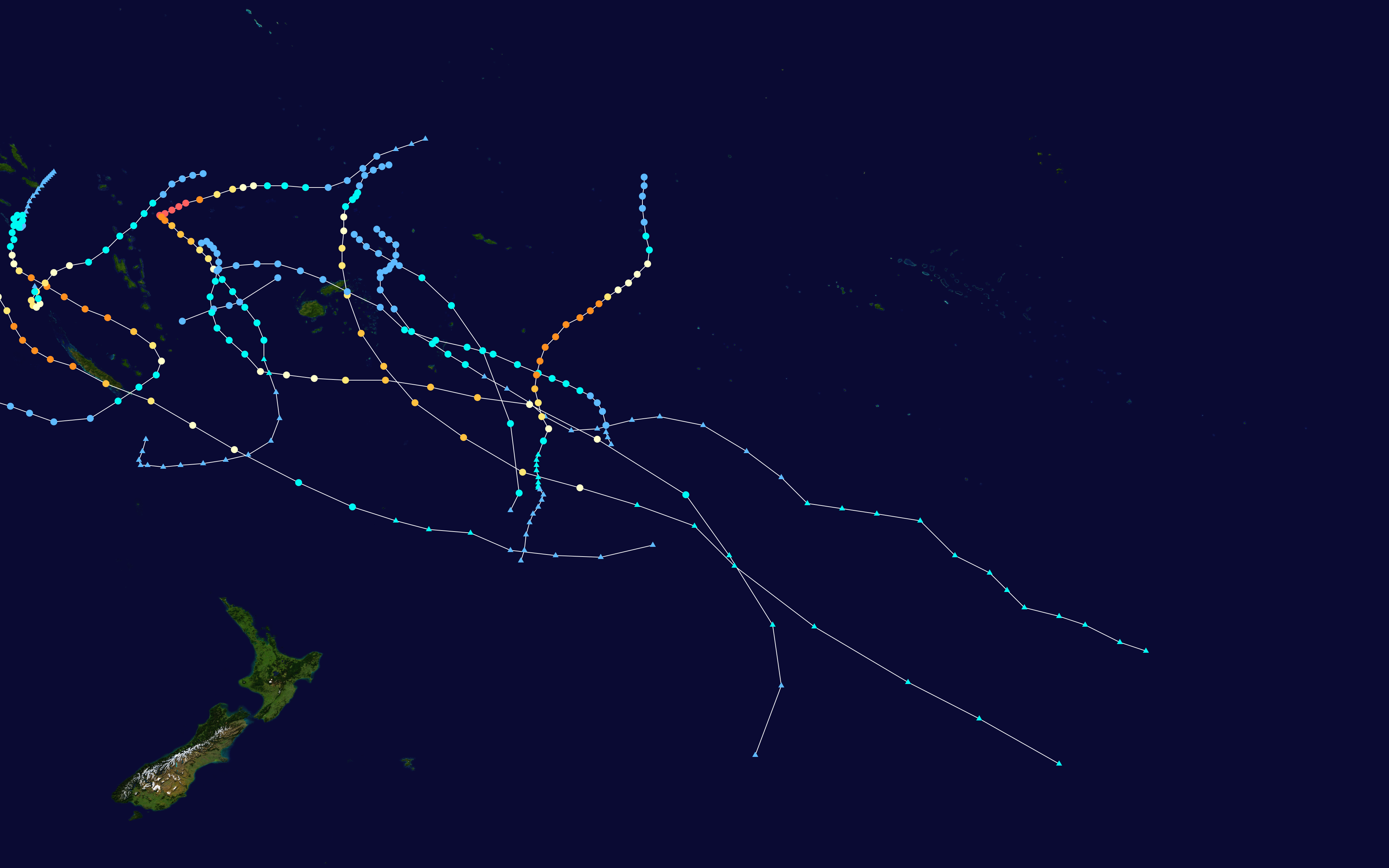
- Season summary map

Seasonal boundaries
- First system formed: July 3, 2002
- Last system dissipated: June 9, 2003

Strongest storm
- Name: Zoe (Second-most intense cyclone in the Southern Hemisphere)
  - Maximum winds: 240 km/h (150 mph) (10-minute sustained)
  - Lowest pressure: 890 hPa (mbar)

Seasonal statistics
- Total disturbances: 18
- Total depressions: 15
- Tropical cyclones: 10
- Severe tropical cyclones: 7
- Total fatalities: 20
- Total damage: $67.2 million (2003 USD)

Related articles
- 2002–03 Australian region cyclone season; 2002–03 South-West Indian Ocean cyclone season

The 2002–03 South Pacific cyclone season was the most active and longest tropical cyclone season since 1997–98, with ten tropical cyclones occurring within the South Pacific basin between 160°E and 120°W. The season started earlier than normal, with two systems developing before the official start of the season on November 1, 2002, while the final system dissipated on June 9, 2003, after the season had officially ended on April 30. During the season, tropical cyclones were officially monitored by the Regional Specialized Meteorological Centre (RSMC) in Nadi, Fiji and the Tropical Cyclone Warning Centres in Brisbane, Australia and Wellington, New Zealand. The United States Armed Forces through the Joint Typhoon Warning Center (JTWC), also monitored the basin and issued unofficial warnings for American interests. RSMC Nadi attaches a number and an F suffix to tropical disturbances that occur within the basin, while the JTWC designates significant tropical cyclones with a number and a P suffix. RSMC Nadi, TCWC Wellington and TCWC Brisbane all use the Australian Tropical Cyclone Intensity Scale and estimate windspeeds over a ten-minute period, while the JTWC estimates sustained winds over a one-minute period, which are subsequently compared to the Saffir–Simpson Hurricane Scale (SSHS).

The season began with Tropical Depression 17F on July 3, several months prior to the official start of the season. In late December, the strongest cyclone of the season, Cyclone Zoe severely affected many islands in the South Pacific, particularly the island of Tikopia. Zoe remained the strongest cyclone recorded in the Southern Hemisphere until Winston surpassed. Shortly after, in mid-January, Cyclone Ami struck Fiji as a Category 3 cyclone, where it caused US$51.2 million in damage. (Note: All monetary figures are in 2003 values.) Cyclone Erica caused considerable damage to New Caledonia as a Category 4 cyclone, causing numerous power outages. The final storm of the season, Cyclone Gina, formed well outside the bounds of the conventional tropical cyclone season, existing entirely in the month of June and causing some damage to Tikopia. As a result of tropical cyclones in the 2002–03 season, US$67.2 million in damages was caused, along with 20 fatalities.

== Seasonal forecasts ==
Climatological season statistics
Source/Record	Tropical Cyclones	Severe Tropical Cyclones
Average (1970–71 — 2001–02)	8.7	4.1
Record high activity:	1997–98: 16	1982–83: 10
Record low activity:	1994–95: 2	1994–95: 0
Activity during this season:	10	7

During November 2002, New Zealand's National Institute of Water and Atmospheric Research predicted that there would be an eastwards shift in activity during the season, with more tropical cyclones than normal expected to the east of the date line, due to well established weak to moderate El Niño conditions. As a result, the island nations of Wallis and Futuna, Niue, Samoa, Tokelau, and the Southern Cook Islands were predicted to experience a higher than average number of tropical cyclones. The Solomon Islands, Fiji, Tuvalu, Tonga, French Polynesia, New Zealand and the Northern Cook Islands were predicted to experience an average number of tropical cyclones, while Southern Papua New Guinea, Vanuatu and New Caledonia were predicted to experience a reduced number of tropical cyclones. In January 2003, NIWA issued an updated outlook, listing the Northern Cook Islands and French Polynesia as areas predicted to experience an above average number of tropical cyclones. In contrast, Vanuatu was predicted to experience below average cyclone activity. The Solomon Islands and Tonga were now predicted to experience a reduced number of tropical cyclones, with all other countries expected to face the same risk as the November outlook.

== Seasonal summary ==
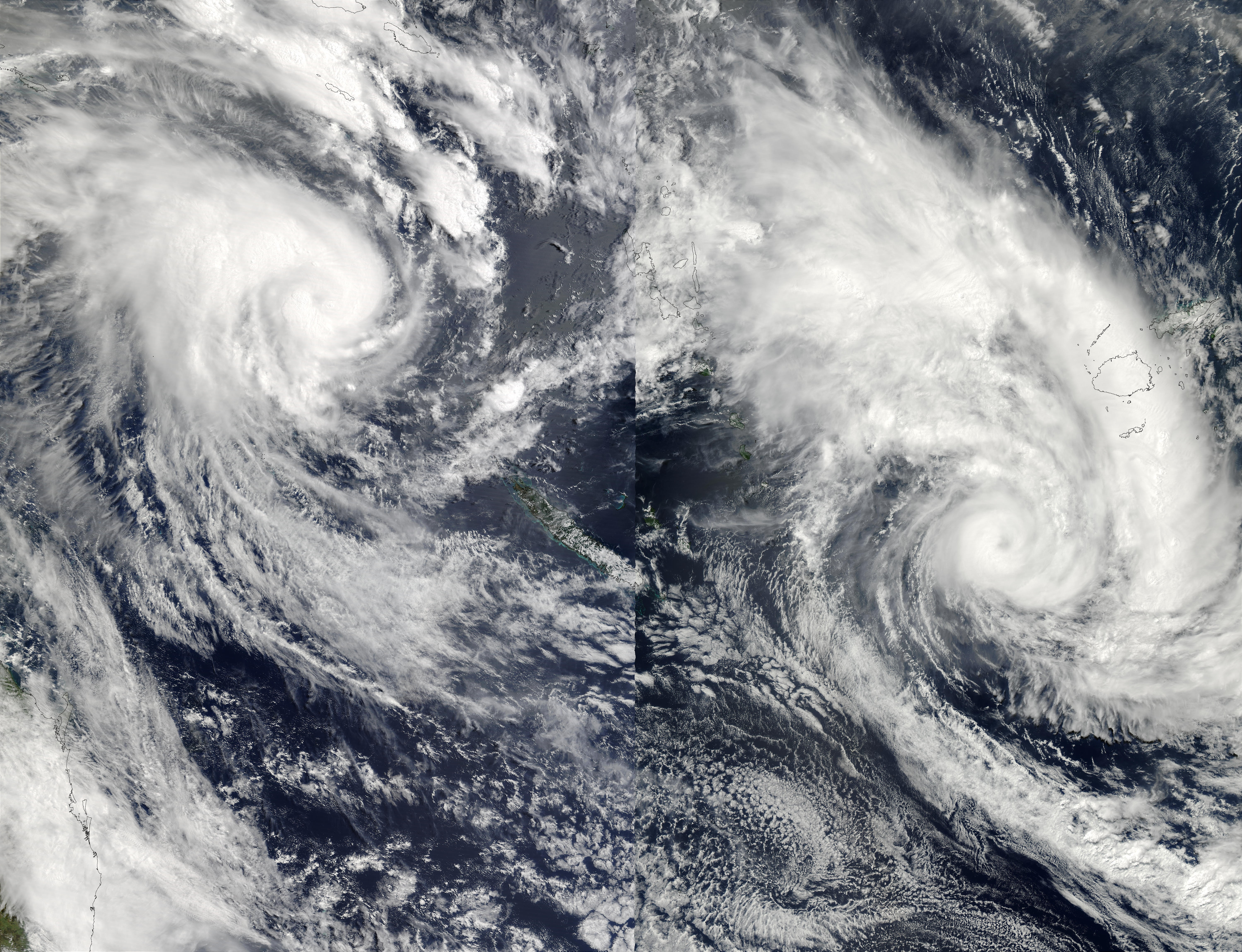
Cyclones Erica (left) and Eseta (right) on March 11.

After three seasons of below average cyclone activity, the 2002–03 season was slightly above average, featuring ten cyclones and seven severe tropical cyclones. One of the cyclones, Cyclone Erica, originated from the Australian region but later moved into the South Pacific, where it impacted New Caledonia. Throughout the season, a moderately warm El Niño–Southern Oscillation (ENSO) generated a shift of cyclone activity away from Australia and towards the open waters of the southern Pacific. As a result, the Southern Oscillation Index (SOI) between November 2002 and June 2003 was negative, averaging -7.2. Sea surface temperatures (SSTs) in the Pacific were above average; for most of the tropical regions, SSTs were above 29 °C (84 °F). At various times, Madden–Julian oscillation (MJO) pulses increased convective activity and thus cyclone development in the basin. Five pulses of the MJO and Equatorial Rossby waves (ER) were responsible for most of the cyclone activity during the season. Cyclone Zoe, the strongest cyclone of the season, was the only cyclone with no connection to any identified MJO or ER wave. By April, an easterly trade wind anomaly took place, signifying the end of the El Niño pattern that had persisted for much of the year.

Over the course of the season, cyclones were active for a total of 40 days, and severe tropical cyclones were active for a total of 19 days, both above average. A total of five tropical disturbances formed during 2002, of which two were cyclones. The first disturbance of the season, Tropical Depression 17F, (Note: Tropical Depression 17F was assigned the designation 17F rather than 01F by RSMC Nadi.) along with another depression, 01F, formed well before the start of the cyclone season on July 3 and October 21 respectively. Cyclone Yolande was the first cyclone of the season, forming on November 29, but did not impact any land masses. In December, two disturbances formed, Tropical Depression 03F and Cyclone Zoe. The latter was the season's strongest cyclone and the strongest cyclone ever recorded in the Southern Hemisphere, affecting areas of the Solomon Islands.

In the first half of 2003, thirteen disturbances formed, of which eight developed into tropical cyclones; six intensified further and became severe tropical cyclones. January 2003 featured four disturbances and three cyclones. Cyclones Ami and Beni were both severe tropical cyclones, with the first extensively impacting Fiji. The month of February was less active compared to January; only two disturbances formed, Cyclone Dovi and Tropical Disturbance 10F, although Dovi would become a Category 5 cyclone on the Australian cyclone scale. March was slightly more active than February; the month featured three tropical depressions and two severe tropical cyclones, Cyclone Erica and Cyclone Eseta, although Erica originally formed west of 160°E. After an easterly wind anomaly arose in April, cyclone activity was suppressed during the month, totalling three tropical disturbances and one cyclone. In June, Cyclone Gina formed as a result of a strong ER wave and later became a severe tropical cyclone, well after the end of the season. Its dissipation on June 9 marked the end of the cyclone season.

== Systems ==
=== Tropical Cyclone Yolande ===
- Category 1 tropical cyclone (Australian scale)
- Tropical storm (SSHWS)
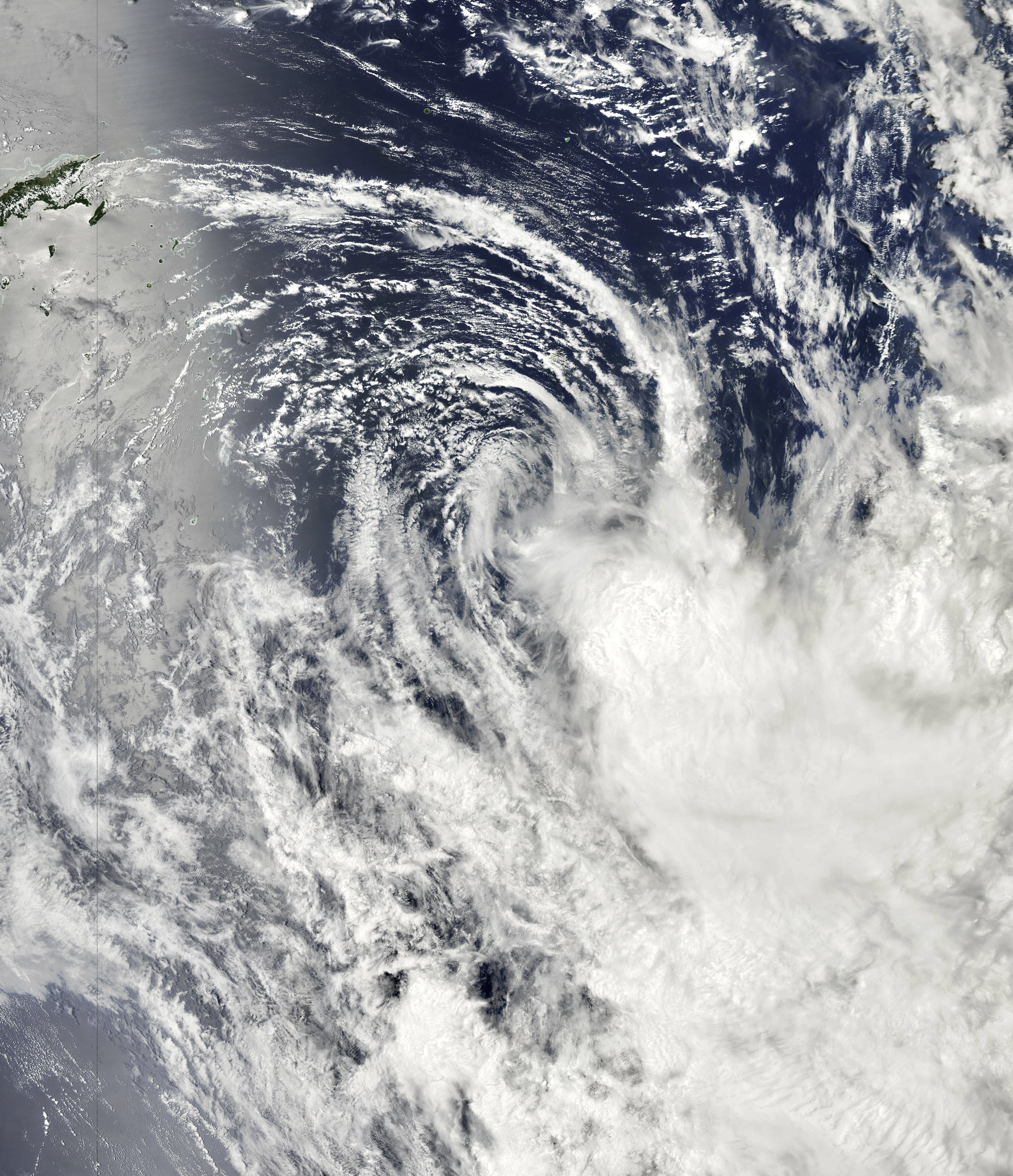
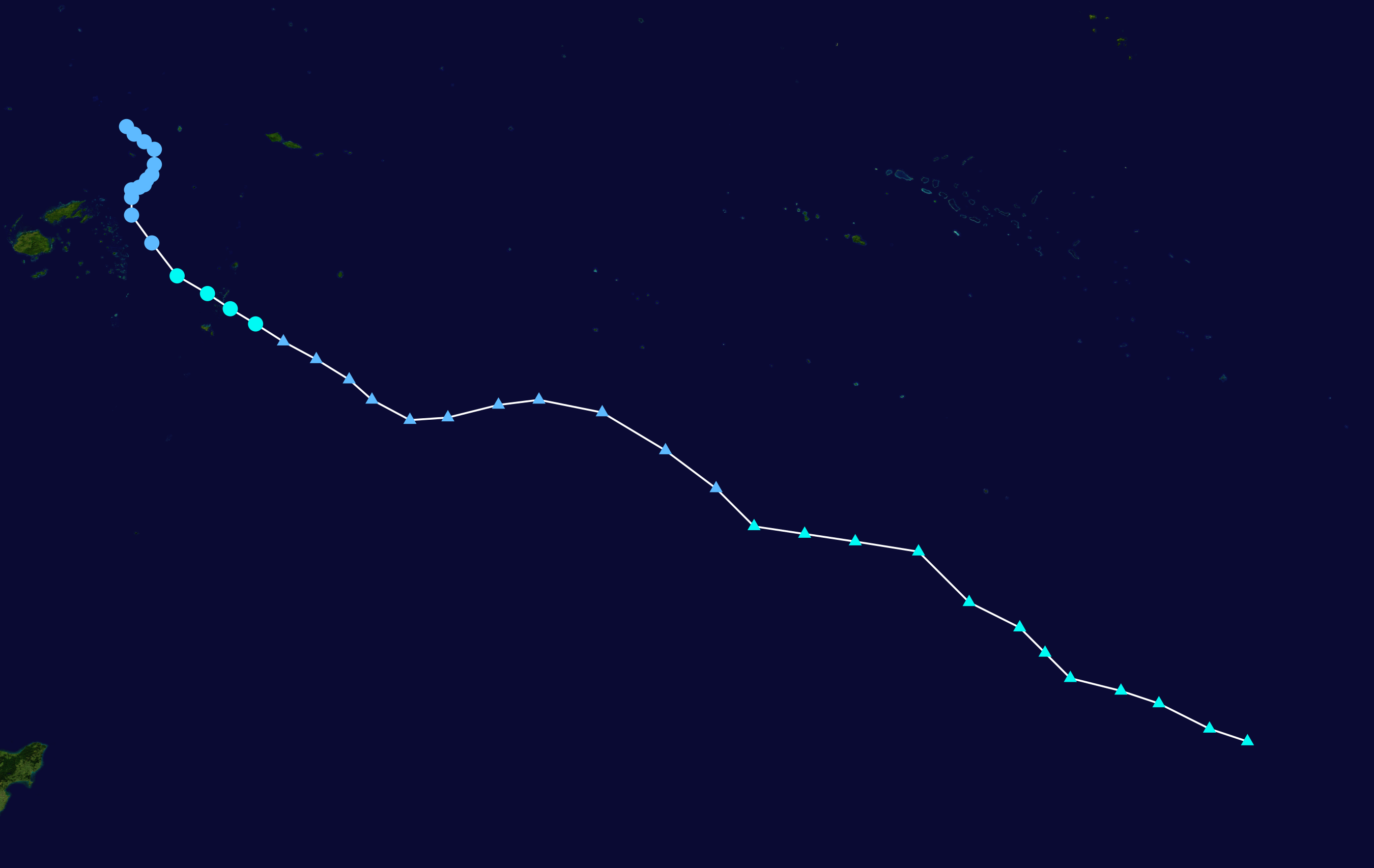
- Duration: November 29 – December 6
- Peak intensity: 65 km/h (40 mph) (10-min); 995 hPa (mbar)

Cyclone Yolande developed on November 29 from a broad area of thunderstorms embedded within a monsoonal trough, originating from a westerly wind burst associated with El Niño conditions; the same area of disturbed weather would later generate Typhoon Pongsona on December 2. At the time, the tropical depression was moving towards the southeast, but strong wind shear displaced the cyclone's strongest winds and convection northeast of its circulation center. Convective activity fluctuated under strong diurnal temperature variation. After moving into an area of less wind shear, the system was able to organize and develop good outflow currents. This was reflected with a slight drop in minimum barometric pressure down to 995 millibars (29.4 inHg). As a result, at 2255 UTC on December 4, the depression attained cyclone status and was given the name Yolande, east of Tonga. After being named, Cyclone Yolande began to accelerate into an area of strong wind shear, and convection became increasingly displaced from the center of circulation. By 1200 UTC on December 5, the convection was already sheared 160 km (99 mi) from the northwest of the circulation center, and as such the cyclone was downgraded to depression status. By this time, Yolande had completed a transition into an extratropical cyclone, after interacting with a baroclinic zone to the southwest. Yolande's extratropical remnants continued to track towards the southeast before dissipating entirely on December 11, 2,700 km (1,700 mi) to the southeast of Papeete, French Polynesia. As a result of remaining at sea, Yolande only caused minimal damage.

=== Severe Tropical Cyclone Zoe ===
- Category 5 severe tropical cyclone (Australian scale)
- Category 5 tropical cyclone (SSHWS)
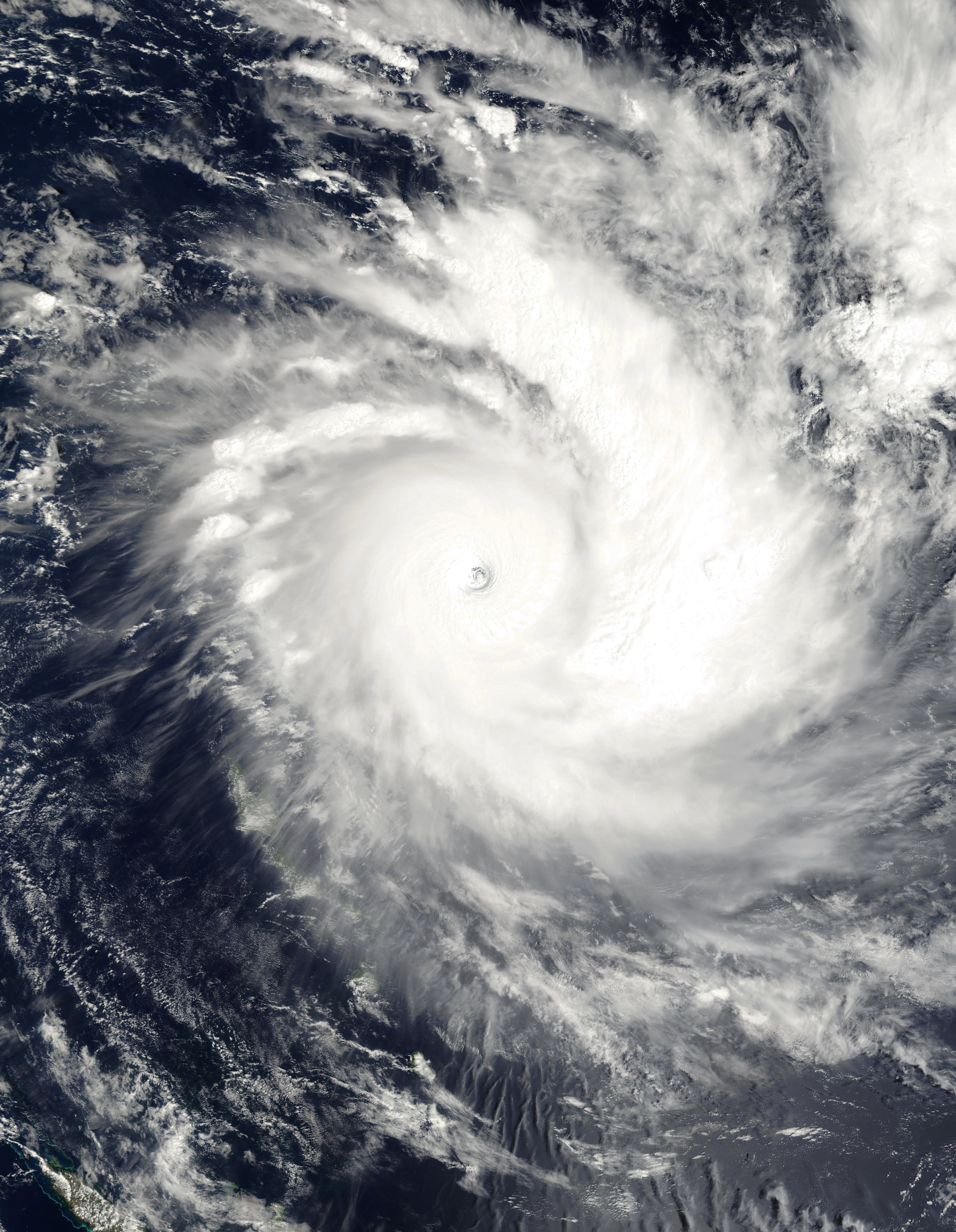
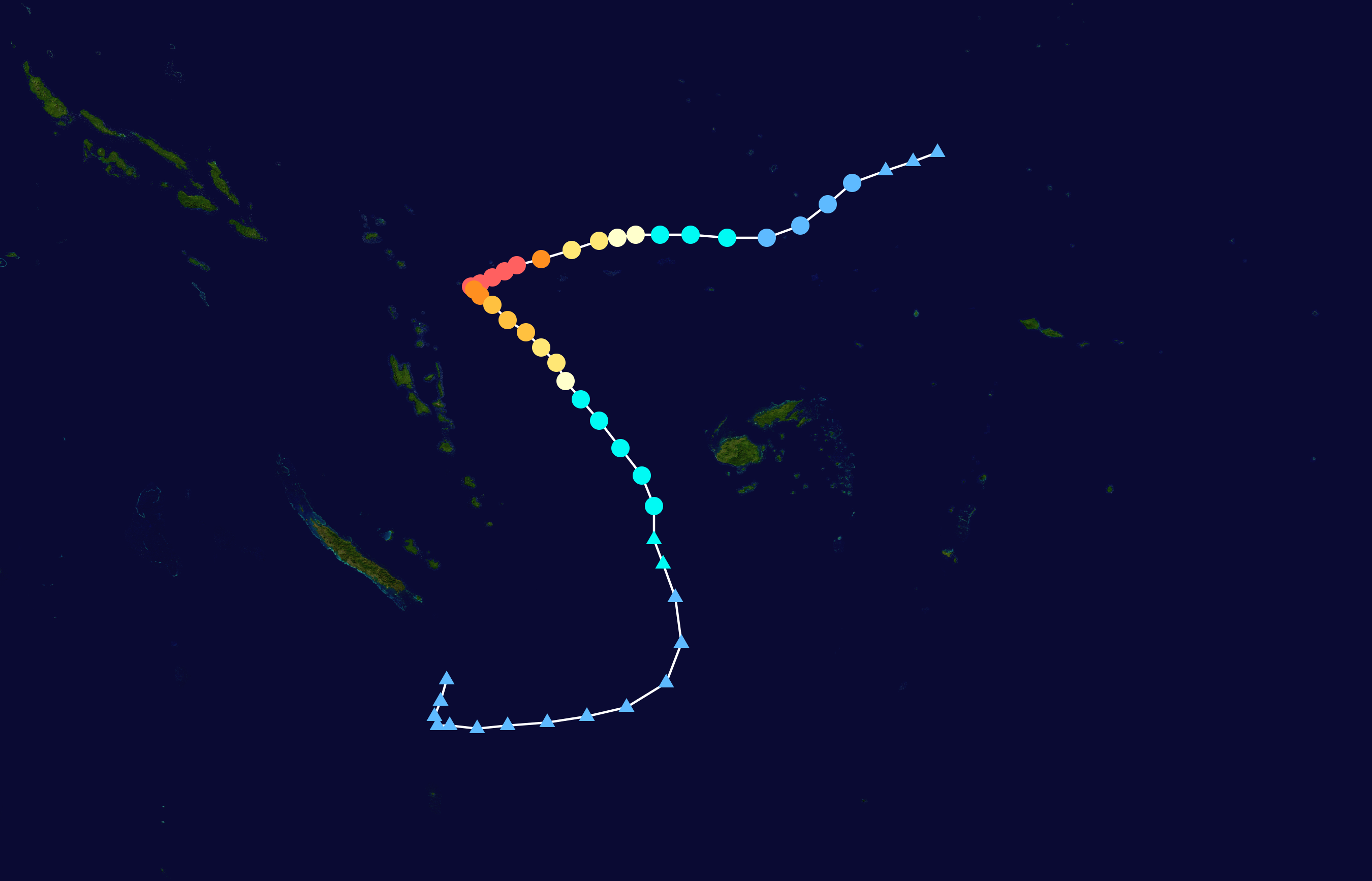
- Duration: December 23 – January 4
- Peak intensity: 240 km/h (150 mph) (10-min); 890 hPa (mbar)

Severe Tropical Cyclone Zoe was the second-most intense tropical cyclone in the Southern Hemisphere in recorded history, severely affecting areas of the Solomon Islands and Vanuatu. Cyclone Zoe developed from the South Pacific Convergence Zone (SPCZ) on December 23, east of Tuvalu. Initially developing slowly as a tropical depression, the predecessor to Zoe moved toward the west-southwest under the influence of a high-pressure area. However, the storm entered an area of very favorable cyclone conditions. After reaching cyclone strength on December 25, rapid intensification ensued. By the next day, Zoe had already strengthened to a severe tropical cyclone. On December 27, Zoe attained wind speeds equivalent to Category 5 status on both the Australian and Saffir–Simpson hurricane scales. An upper-level trough of low pressure forced Zoe towards the southwest, moving into the vicinity of the Solomon Islands. The next day, Zoe intensified to a record low barometric pressure of 890 millibars (26 inHg), with winds of 290 km/h (180 mph). However, conditions would deteriorate, and the cyclone would consequently weaken. By January 1, the storm had already degenerated into an extratropical cyclone, and its remnants dissipated just three days later.

Cyclone Zoe severely impacted the islands of the Solomon island chain, particularly the islands of Tikopia and Anuta. In Anuta, agricultural activities were disrupted. Various fruit trees and crops, especially in gardens on the island's hills, were destroyed by high winds and heavy rain. In addition, communications with other islands were disrupted. The impact on Tikopia was much greater; agricultural productivity on the island was said to have been wiped out. Fruit trees were estimated only to begin producing fruit again at least two years after Zoe's impact. Topsoil was left dry by the cyclone, preventing any immediate replacement of lost crops.

=== Severe Tropical Cyclone Ami ===
- Category 3 severe tropical cyclone (Australian scale)
- Category 3 tropical cyclone (SSHWS)
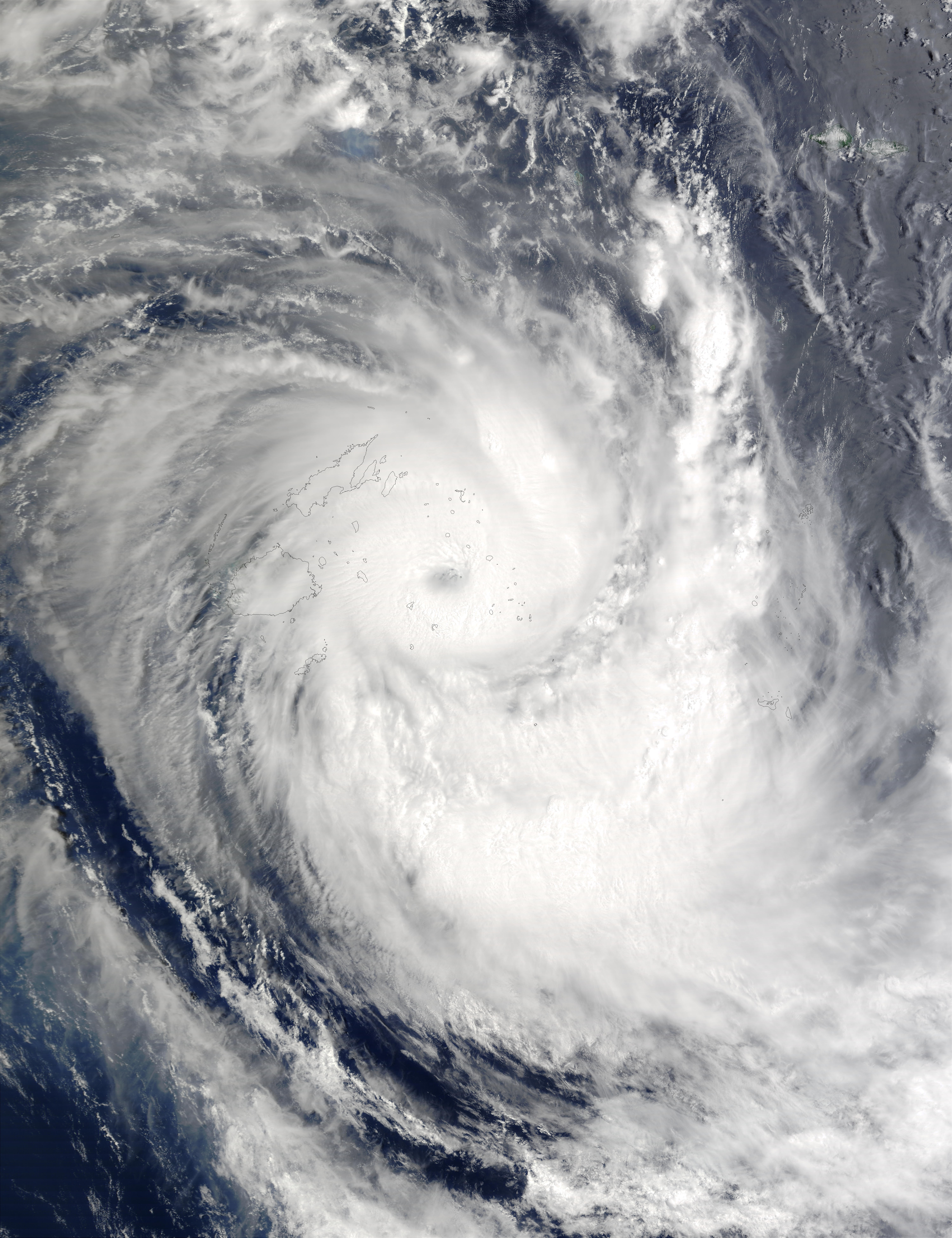
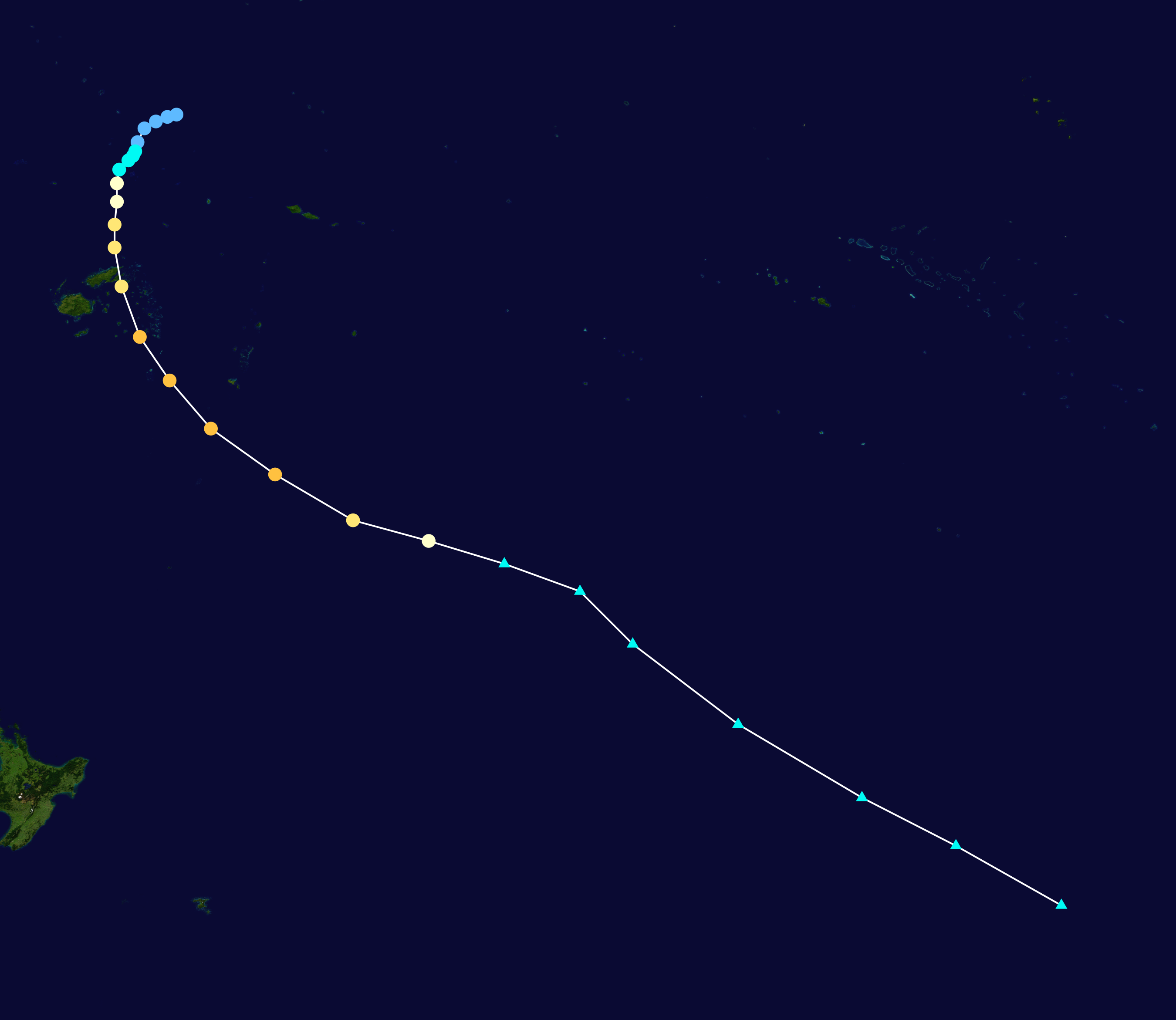
- Duration: January 9 – January 15
- Peak intensity: 150 km/h (90 mph) (10-min); 950 hPa (mbar)

Severe Tropical Cyclone Ami was one of the worst cyclones ever to affect Fiji. Cyclone Ami developed from a low-pressure area east of Tuvalu on January 12. The storm moved slowly towards the southwest early in its existence. Influenced by an upper-level trough, Ami slowed down and began moving towards the south and then southeast. The cyclone attained severe tropical cyclone intensity on January 13. Ami made its first landfall at Vanua Levu, before subsequently making another landfall on Taveuni. Ami reached peak intensity as an equivalent Category 3 cyclone on the Australian cyclone scale on January 14. Accelerating to the southeast, the cyclone began to cross over cool sea surface temperatures and encountered wind shear. Ami transitioned into an extratropical cyclone the day after.

Cyclone Ami severely impacted parts of Fiji, mainly through flooding. Numerous landslides and power outages were caused by the heavy rains. The damage was particularly severe in Labasa, where the entire city was inundated. Sugar cane production decreased by 15%, and other crops also suffered heavily. In Tonga, damage was not as severe, but two ships were grounded. Ami caused F$104.4 million (US$51.2 million) in damages and 14 deaths, primarily on Fiji. Following the deaths and damage, the name "Ami" was later retired.

=== Severe Tropical Cyclone Beni ===
- Category 5 severe tropical cyclone (Australian scale)
- Category 4 tropical cyclone (SSHWS)
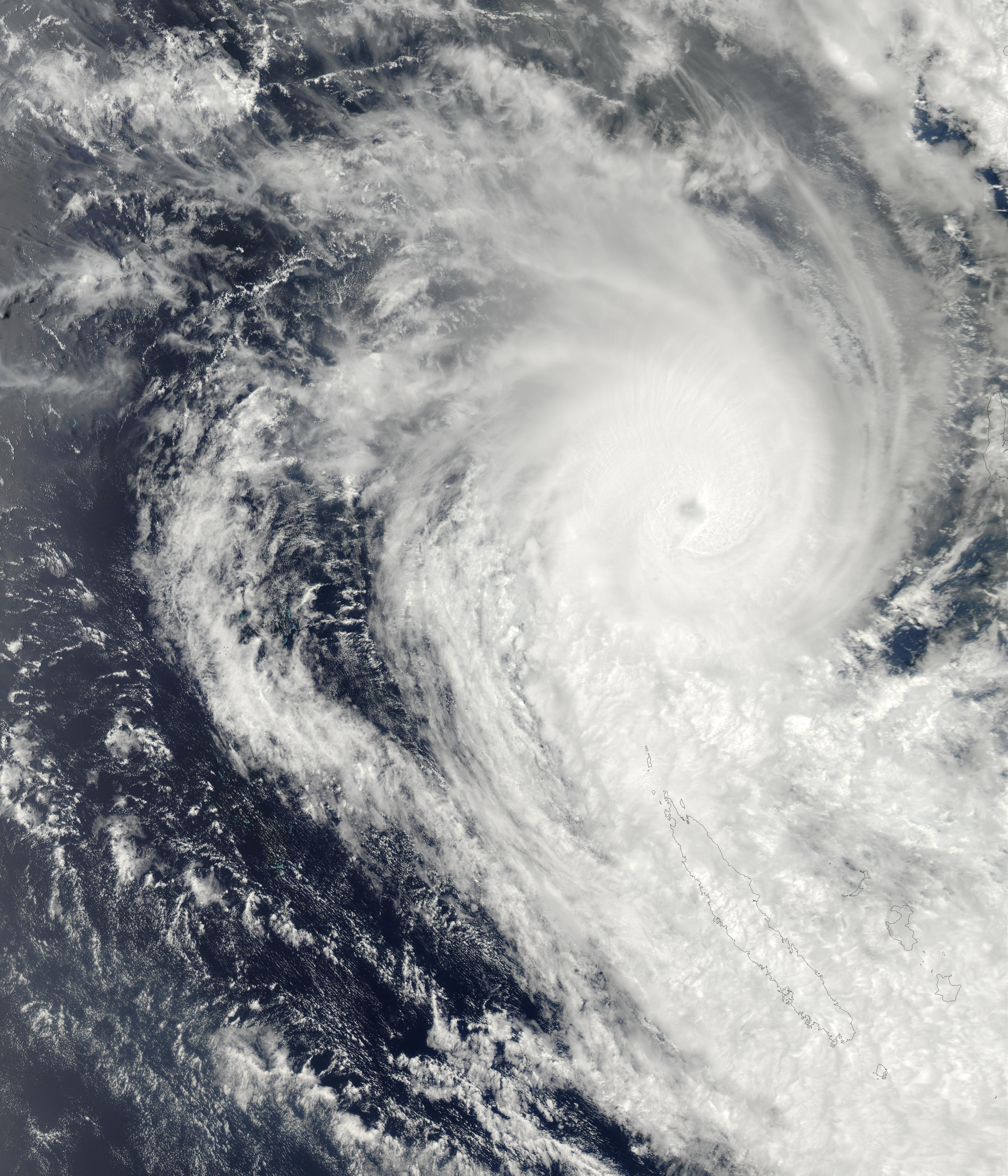
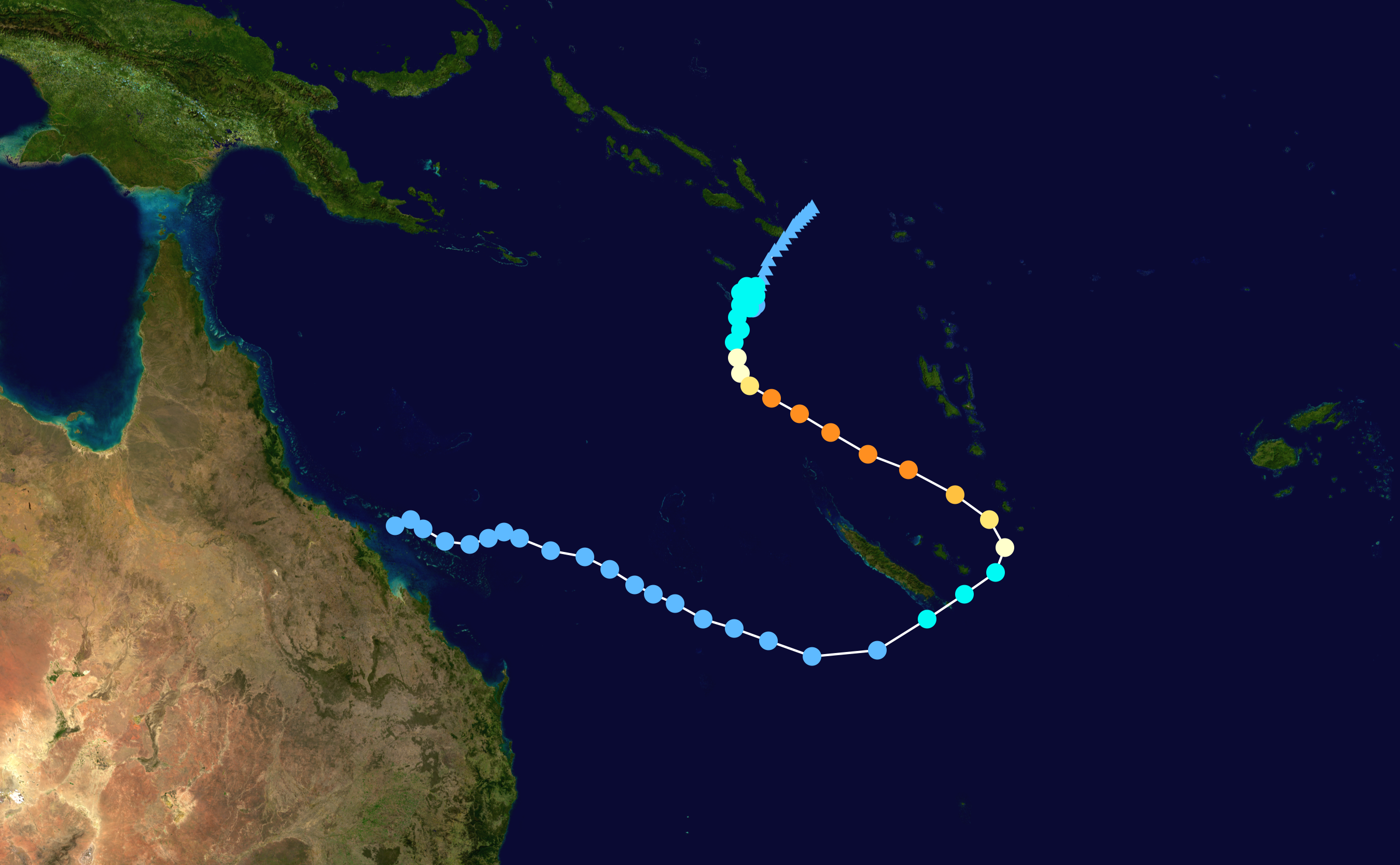
- Duration: January 20 – January 31 (Exited basin)
- Peak intensity: 205 km/h (125 mph) (10-min); 920 hPa (mbar)

Severe Tropical Cyclone Beni was an intense tropical cyclone that affected areas of the southern Pacific Ocean, particularly in New Caledonia. It developed from a tropical disturbance on January 20 south of the Solomon Islands, and at first moved slowly towards the west. On January 25, the disturbance gained enough strength and organization to be named Beni. It quickly made a clockwise loop, maintaining its intensity, and later headed south. After fluctuating in intensity, Beni entered more conducive conditions and began to strengthen, this time heading southeast. Traveling between Vanuatu and New Caledonia, Beni reached its peak intensity as a Category 5 tropical cyclone on January 29, the highest rating on the Australian cyclone scale, with winds of 235 km/h (146 mph). It only maintained this intensity for a short time before an increase in wind shear and less favorable conditions induced its weakening. After nearing Vanuatu, a strengthening ridge forced Beni towards the southwest, away from Vanuatu. The cyclone made its closest approach to the island of New Caledonia on January 30, but only as a marginal Category 1 cyclone. Continuing to weaken under strong wind shear, Beni was downgraded to a tropical depression the same day. After crossing New Caledonia, Beni exited the South Pacific basin and entered the Australian region.

During Beni's existence, parts of the Solomon Islands, Vanuatu, and Queensland were affected by the storm. The cyclone caused flooding and a food shortage in the Solomon Islands. An estimated 2,000 people were evacuated as a result. Rough seas and storm surge, as well as strong gusts, were the primary effects of Beni on Vanuatu and New Caledonia. New Caledonia was hit by power outages, and Vanuatu mainly suffered beach erosion.

=== Tropical Cyclone Cilla ===
- Category 1 tropical cyclone (Australian scale)
- Tropical storm (SSHWS)
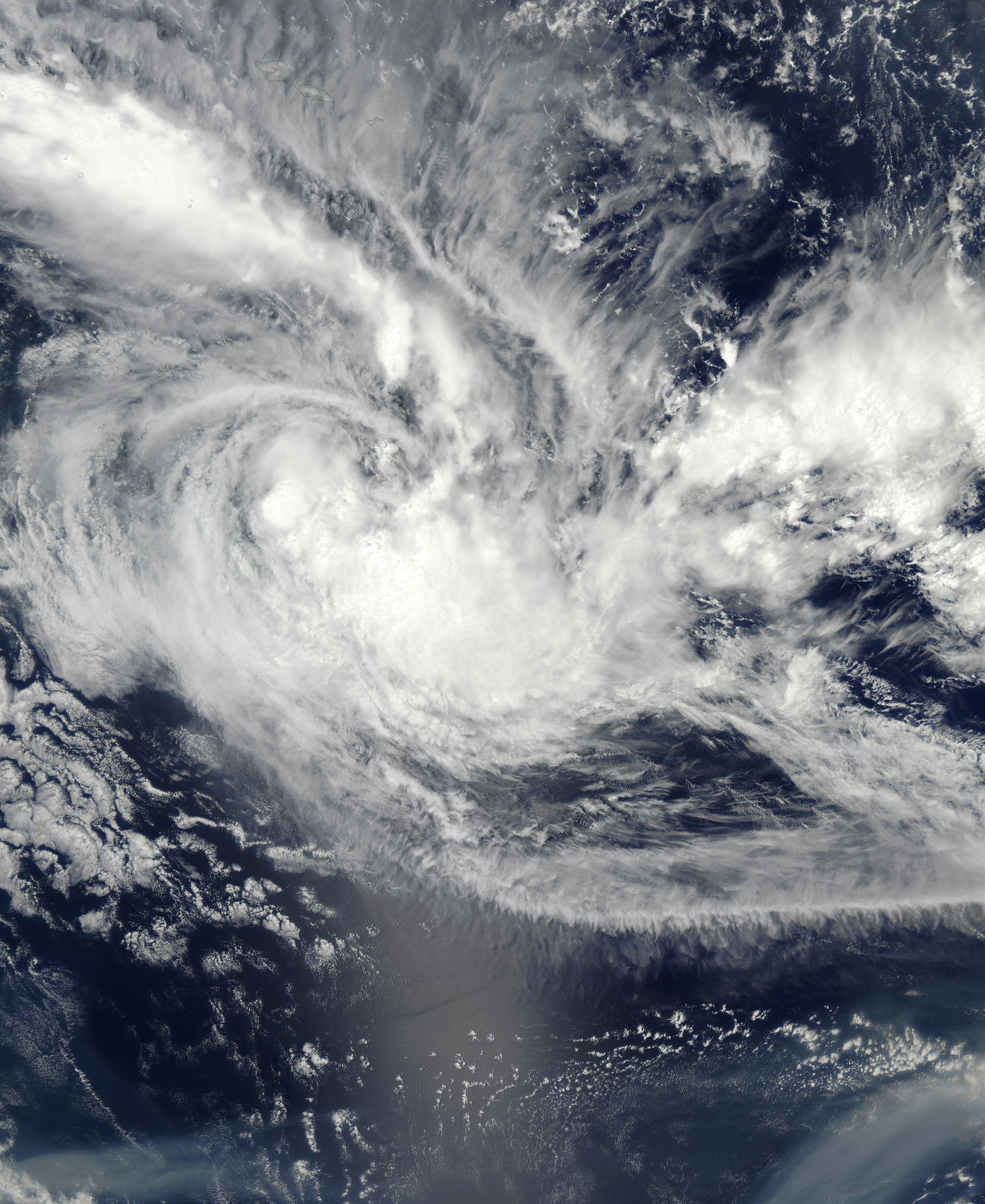
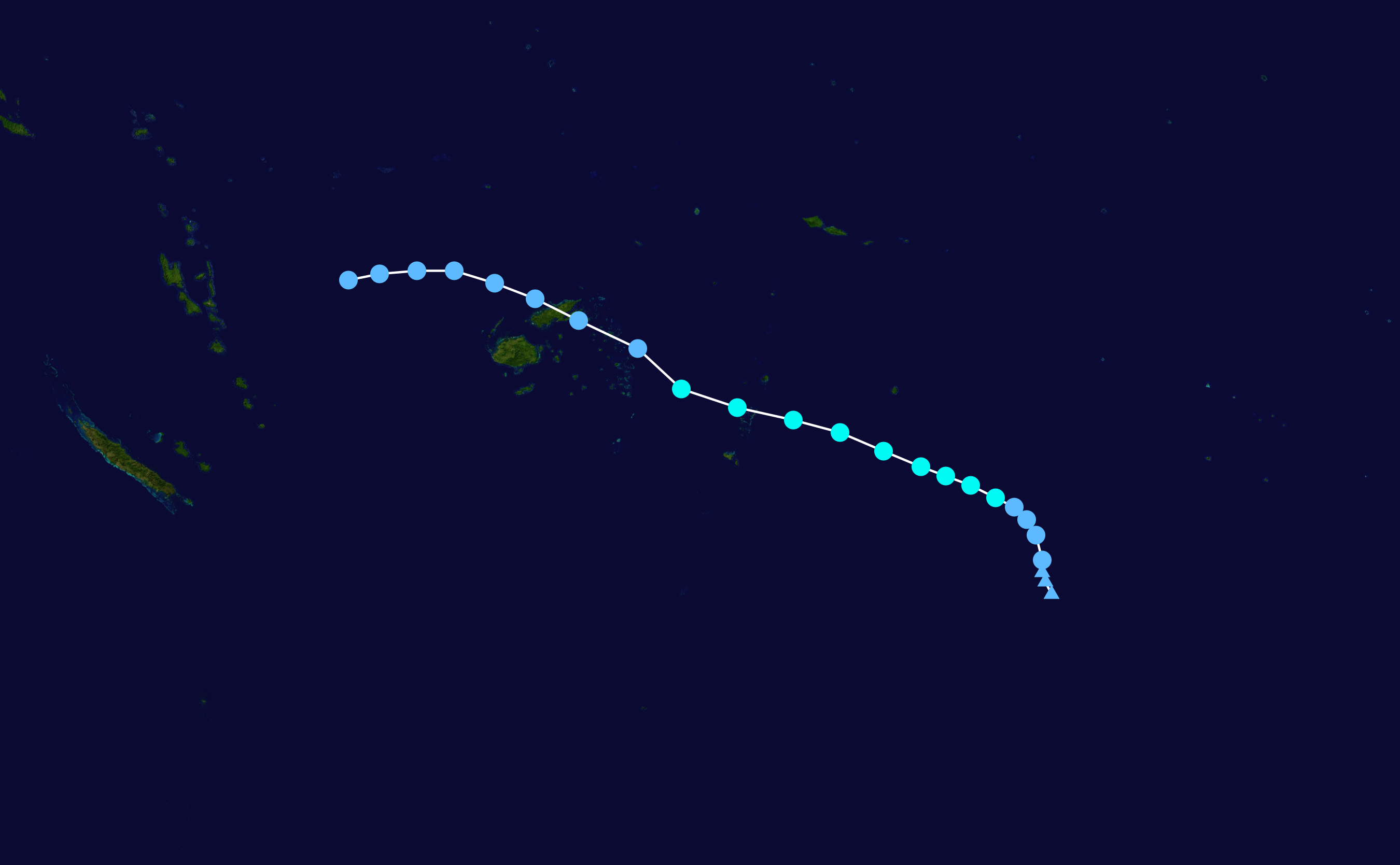
- Duration: January 27 – January 29
- Peak intensity: 75 km/h (45 mph) (10-min); 995 hPa (mbar)

Cyclone Cilla affected several islands in the South Pacific. The cyclone developed from a monsoon trough on January 26 northwest of Fiji, and initially moved to the east in conditions unfavourable for cyclones. After wind shear lessened, Cilla reached its peak intensity on January 28, attaining maximum winds of 75 km/h (47 mph) sustained over 10 minutes. After slightly weakening, Cilla was able to intensify again to match this intensity on January 29. Strong vertical wind shear conditions then returned, and Cilla transitioned into an extratropical cyclone.

Cilla dropped heavy rainfall over islands along its path. As a depression the storm dropped rain over Fiji, which had already been effected by Cyclone Ami just two weeks earlier. Damage in Tonga was mostly limited to vegetation and fruit trees; damage to infrastructure was relatively minor. Rain also fell on American Samoa, although no damage was reported. After the season, the name "Cilla" was retired.

=== Severe Tropical Cyclone Dovi ===
- Category 5 severe tropical cyclone (Australian scale)
- Category 4 tropical cyclone (SSHWS)
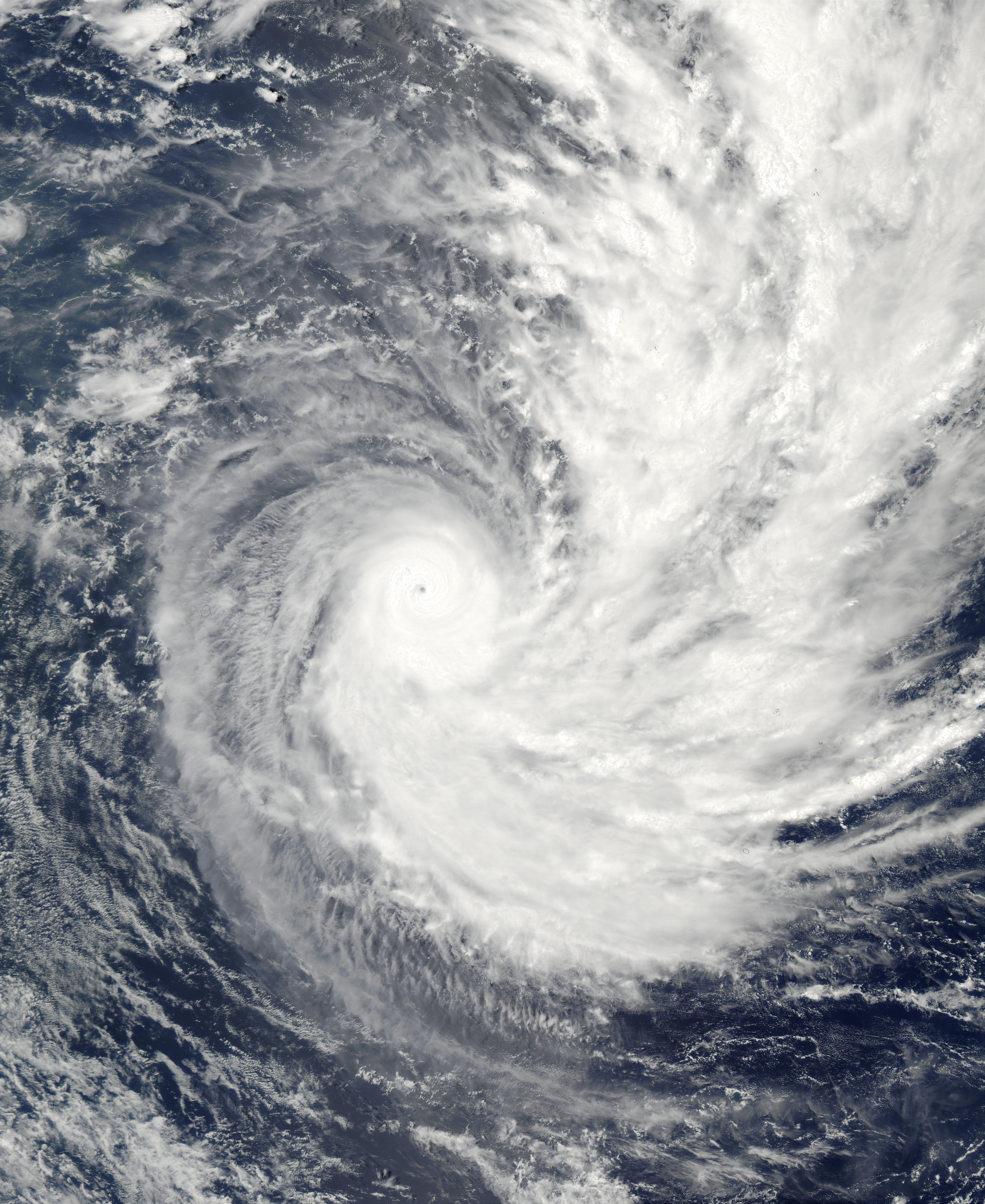
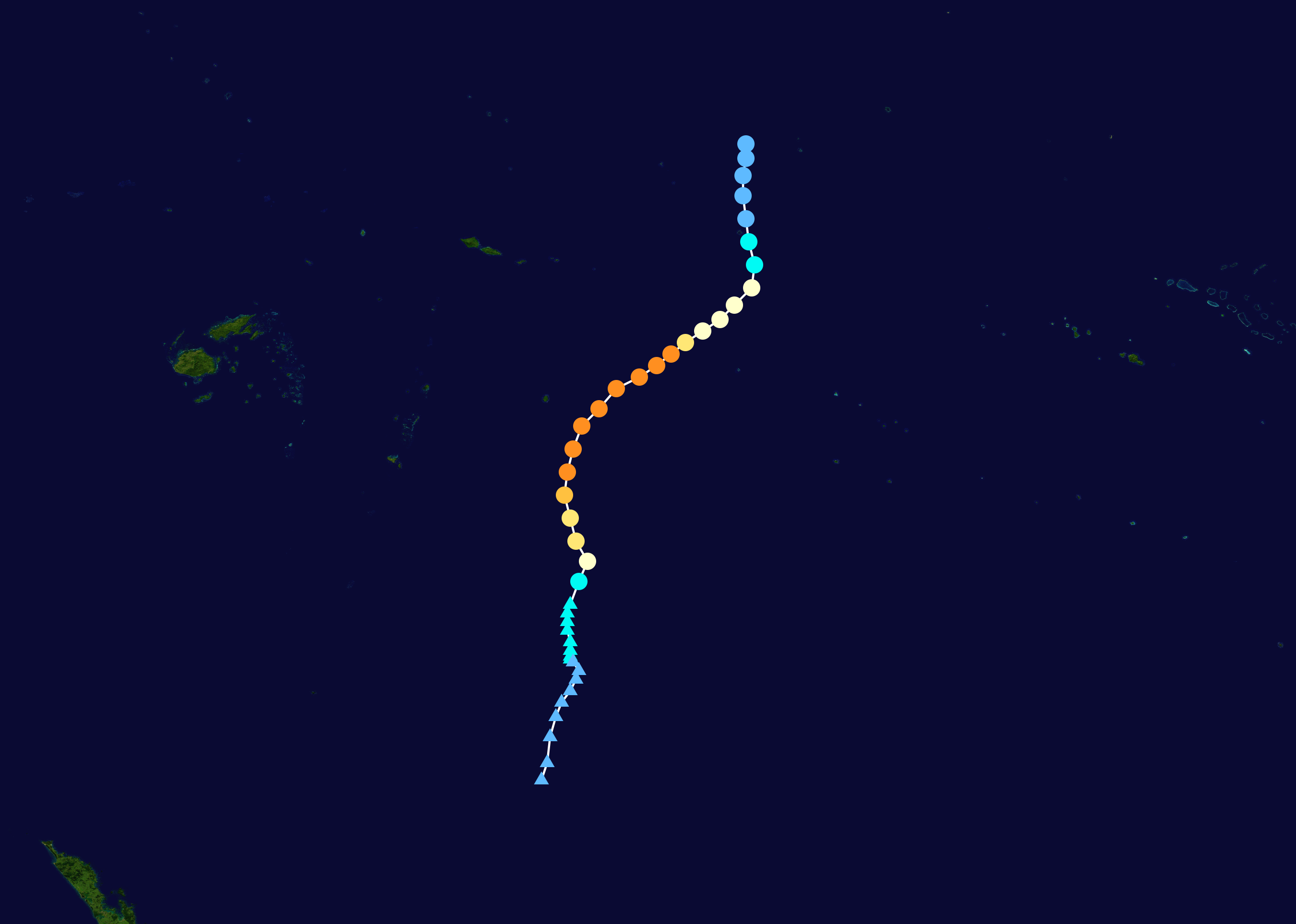
- Duration: February 5 – February 11
- Peak intensity: 205 km/h (125 mph) (10-min); 920 hPa (mbar)

Cyclone Dovi developed on February 5 from an area of circulation within the SPCZ near the northern Cook Islands. Dovi therefore saw favourable conditions throughout much of its existence. Due to a mid–level ridge to the east, the cyclone progressed on a southward track. Dovi eventually steered to the southwest, and continued to intensify steadily after fluctuating due to diurnal temperature variations, becoming a Category 1 equivalent on the Saffir–Simpson hurricane scale on February 8. An anticyclone positioned to the west of the system moved closer to Dovi, providing an improved environment. After developing an eye later that day, Dovi attained its maximum wind speeds of 205 km/h (127 mph) sustained over 10 minutes. The cyclone then again steered towards the south, encountering high wind shear and cooler sea surface temperatures. As a result, Dovi quickly weakened as its convection was displaced. While its outflow in its western and southern quadrants remained favorable, elsewhere outflow was deteriorating. On February 10, Dovi's minimum barometric pressure was 980 millibars (29 inHg) as it moved south-southeast at 11 km/h (6.8 mph). The weakening Dovi became an extratropical cyclone on February 11. The remnants continued drifting southwest; the Meteorological Service of New Zealand in Wellington stopped issuing information on it on February 13.

Despite its close proximity to islands along its path, Dovi caused only minimal damage. Oceanic swells and storm surge were felt in some coastal areas. Strong winds were reported in the southern Cook Islands and Niue. Damage to banana plantations on Palmerston Island was reported, but Dovi caused no fatalities.

=== Severe Tropical Cyclone Eseta ===
- Category 4 severe tropical cyclone (Australian scale)
- Category 3 tropical cyclone (SSHWS)
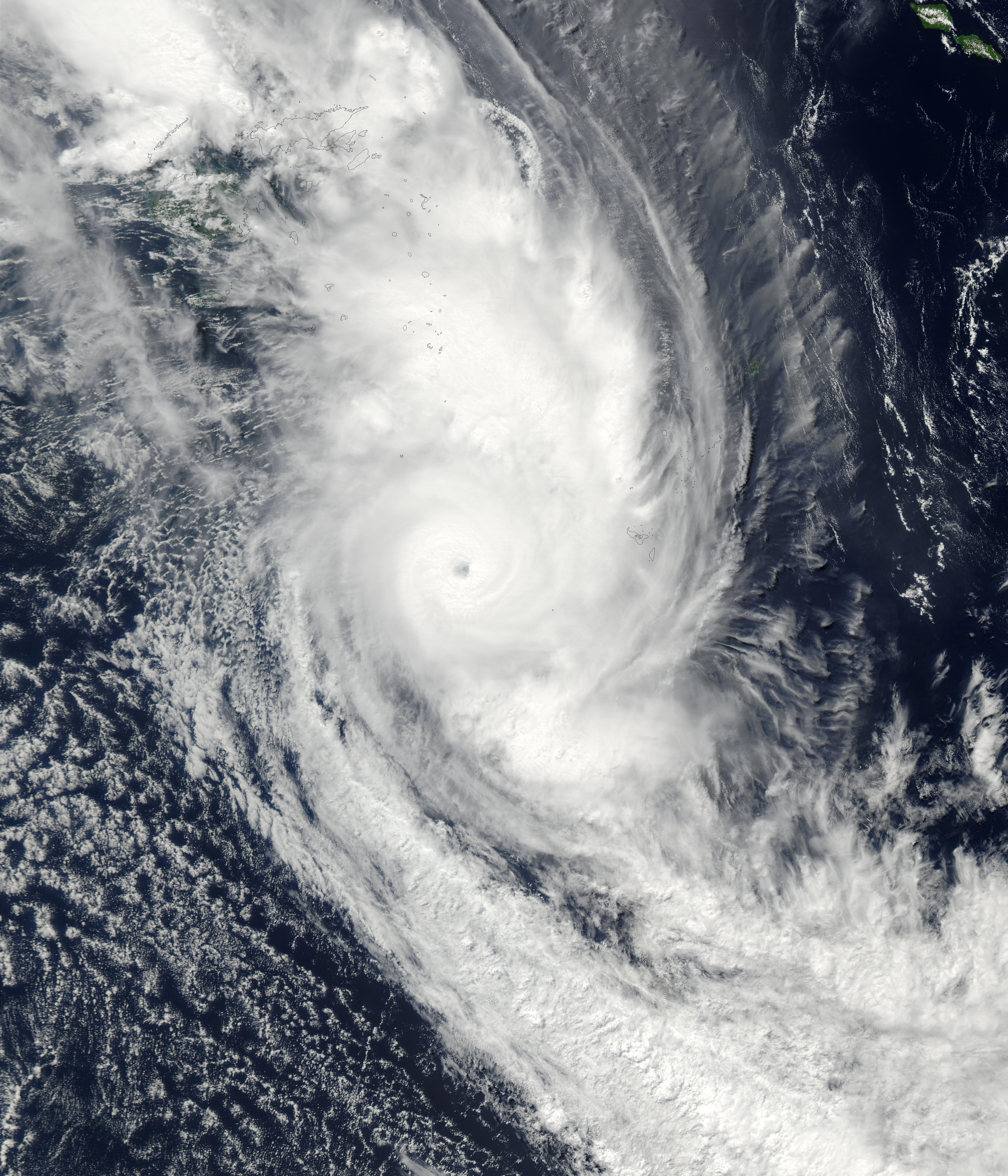
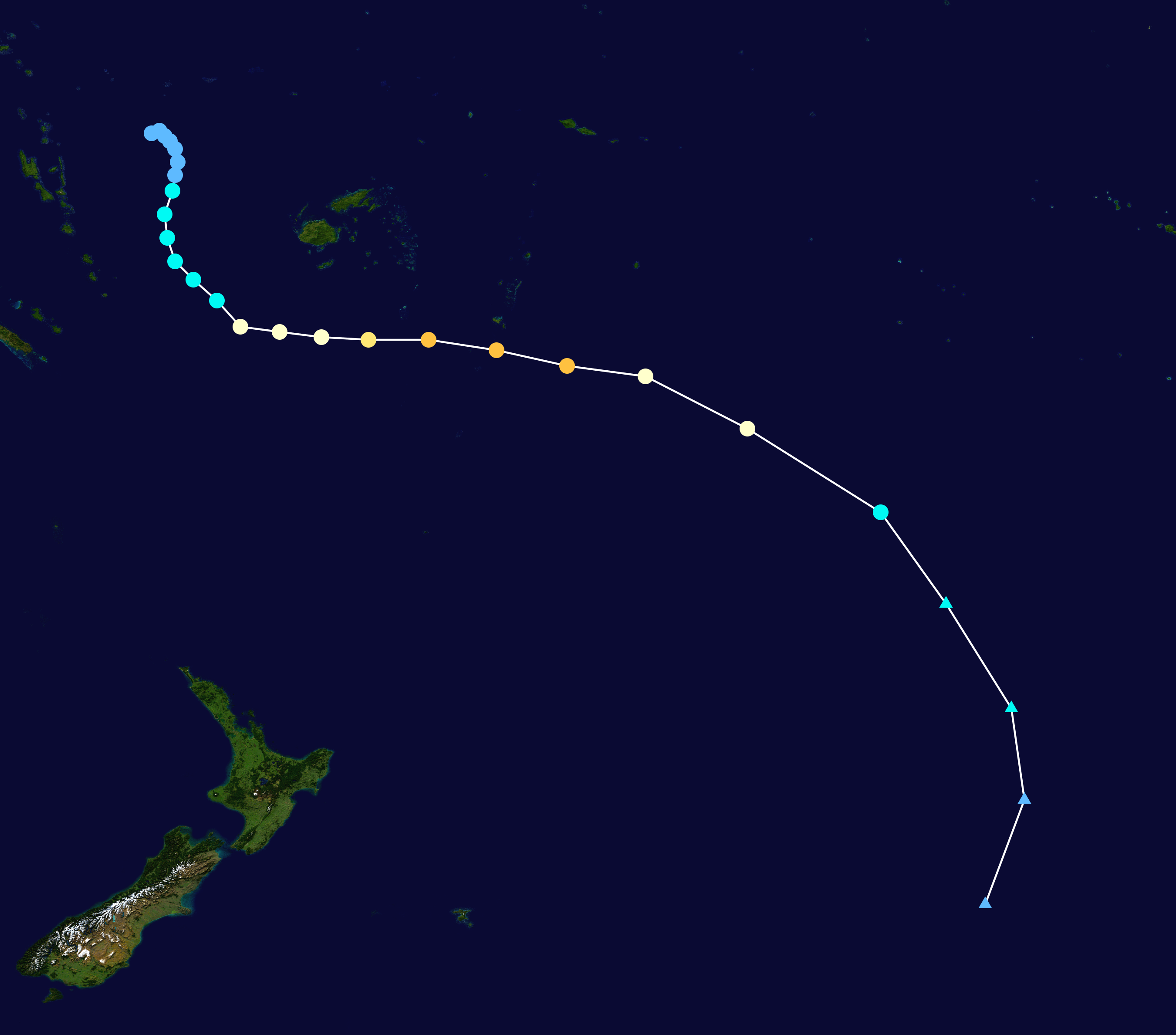
- Duration: March 10 – March 14
- Peak intensity: 185 km/h (115 mph) (10-min); 930 hPa (mbar)

Cyclone Eseta developed on March 10 from an area of disturbed weather that originated in the vicinity of Vanuatu. At the time the cyclone was in very favourable conditions, in an area with warm sea–surface temperatures, low wind shear, and with development enhanced by an MJO pulse traversing the area at the time. After convection began to wrap around the center of circulation, the low–pressure area was named Eseta. The Joint Typhoon Warning Center (JTWC) began issuing warnings on Eseta at 1200 UTC on March 10; Eseta had a minimum pressure of 995 millibars (29.4 inHg) at the time. As the cyclone was on the western periphery of a mid–level ridge, it moved in a south-southeastwardly direction, initially at 13 km/h (8.1 mph). It then intensified quickly, and the next day developed a ragged eye. As it began to curve around the mid–level ridge, its forward speed increased to 21 km/h (13 mph). Favorable conditions continued on March 12, and Eseta underwent rapid intensification, with its barometric pressure falling 40 millibars (1.2 inHg) to a minimum of 930 millibars (27 inHg). Wind speeds increased to 185 km/h (115 mph) sustained for 10 minutes. However, the cyclone only maintained this intensity for 12 hours before entering an area of strong vertical wind shear. It continued to accelerate in forward speed, but shower activity became elongated and the eye dissipated. The next day, Eseta had a forward speed of 55 km/h (34 mph). As a result, the cyclone lost tropical characteristics on March 14. The JTWC issued its last warning on Eseta at 0000 UTC on March 4 as it became extratropical. Eseta was absorbed by a front the next day.

Although Eseta was well offshore of any islands in the Pacific, rains and wind caused some damage. Western regions of Fiji reported heavy rain and flooding as the cyclone passed to its south. As a weakening cyclone, Eseta passed over the Tongan island of Eua, destroying fruit trees and kava crops. No deaths were reported due to Eseta.

=== Severe Tropical Cyclone Erica ===
- Category 5 severe tropical cyclone (Australian scale)
- Category 4 tropical cyclone (SSHWS)
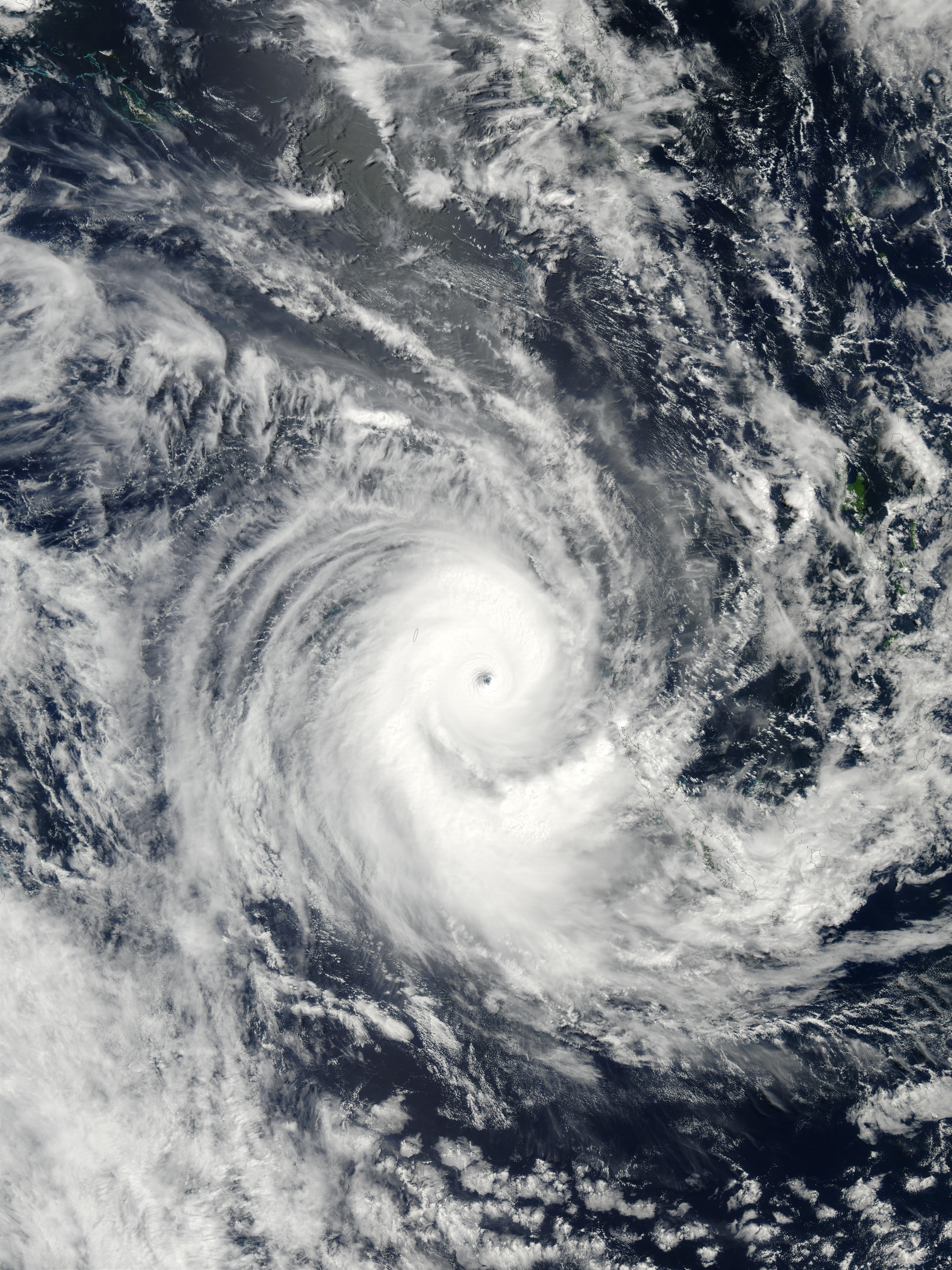
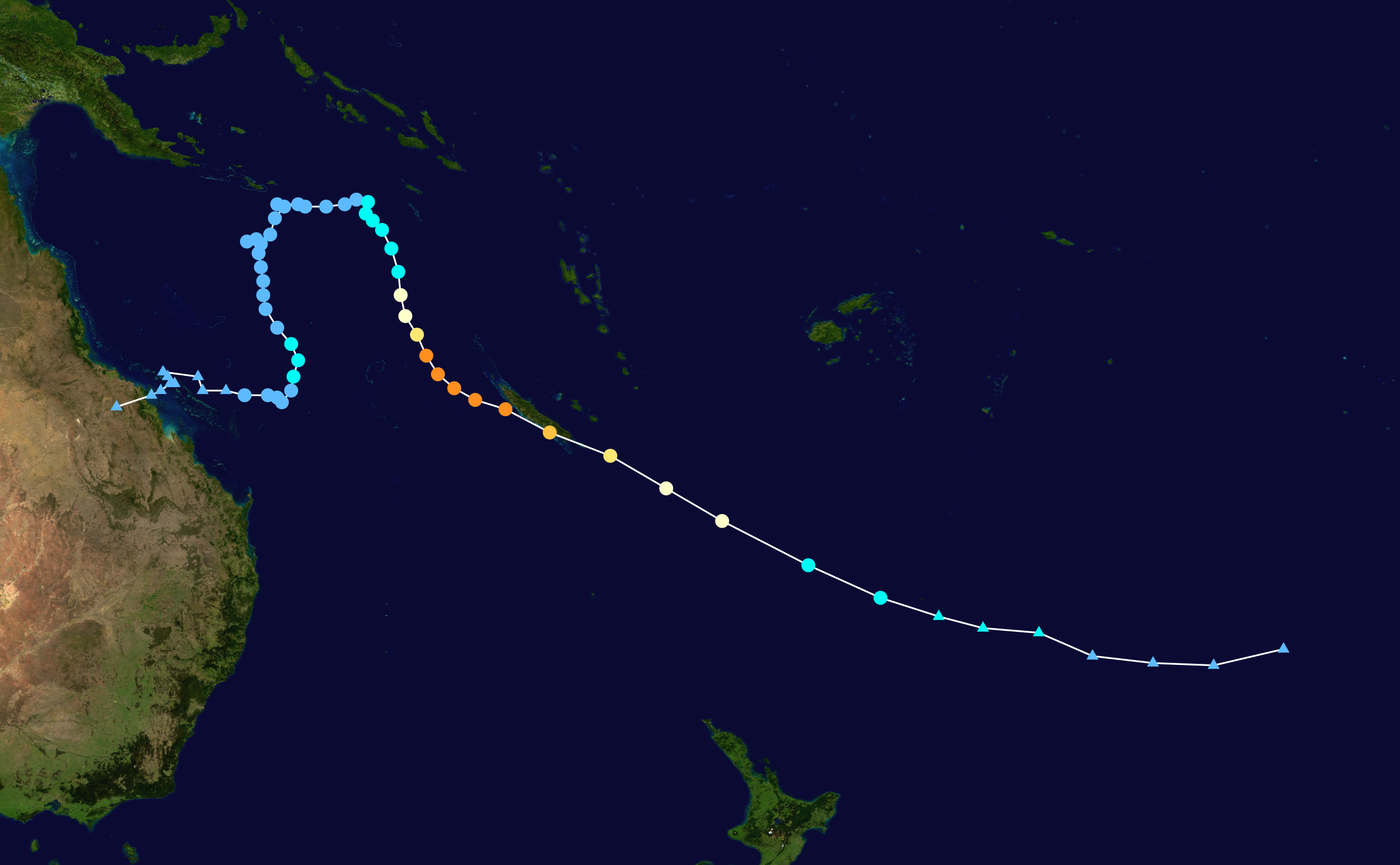
- Duration: March 12 (entered basin) – March 15
- Peak intensity: 215 km/h (130 mph) (10-min); 915 hPa (mbar)

Severe Tropical Cyclone Erica was a powerful cyclone considered the worst to affect New Caledonia since Cyclone Beti. It developed from a monsoonal trough on March 4 just off Queensland in the Australian cyclone region. Once it entered the South Pacific cyclone region on March 12, Erica steadily intensified in a favourable environment, reaching peak intensity on March 13 as a Category 4 equivalent on the Saffir–Simpson Hurricane Scale. On that day Erica paralleled the coast of New Caledonia, before making landfall on the southern end of the island at L'Île-des-Pins. At the same time the cyclone entered an area with strong wind shear and thus began to weaken. After passing the island, an extratropical transition began, weakening the cyclone as it moved southeast. On March 15, Erica completed its transition into an extratropical cyclone and fully dissipated the next day.

Cyclone Erica severely impacted the island nation of New Caledonia, causing intense winds and heavy rain. An estimated 892 families were affected by the cyclone on the island, and two people were killed. As many as 60% of people on the west coast lost power. On March 17 only seventeen of the sixty-six secondary schools on the island were functioning. After the storm it was feared that the existing dengue fever epidemic on the island would spread. Erica caused US$15 million in damages, primarily on New Caledonia.

=== Tropical Cyclone Fili ===
- Category 2 tropical cyclone (Australian scale)
- Tropical storm (SSHWS)
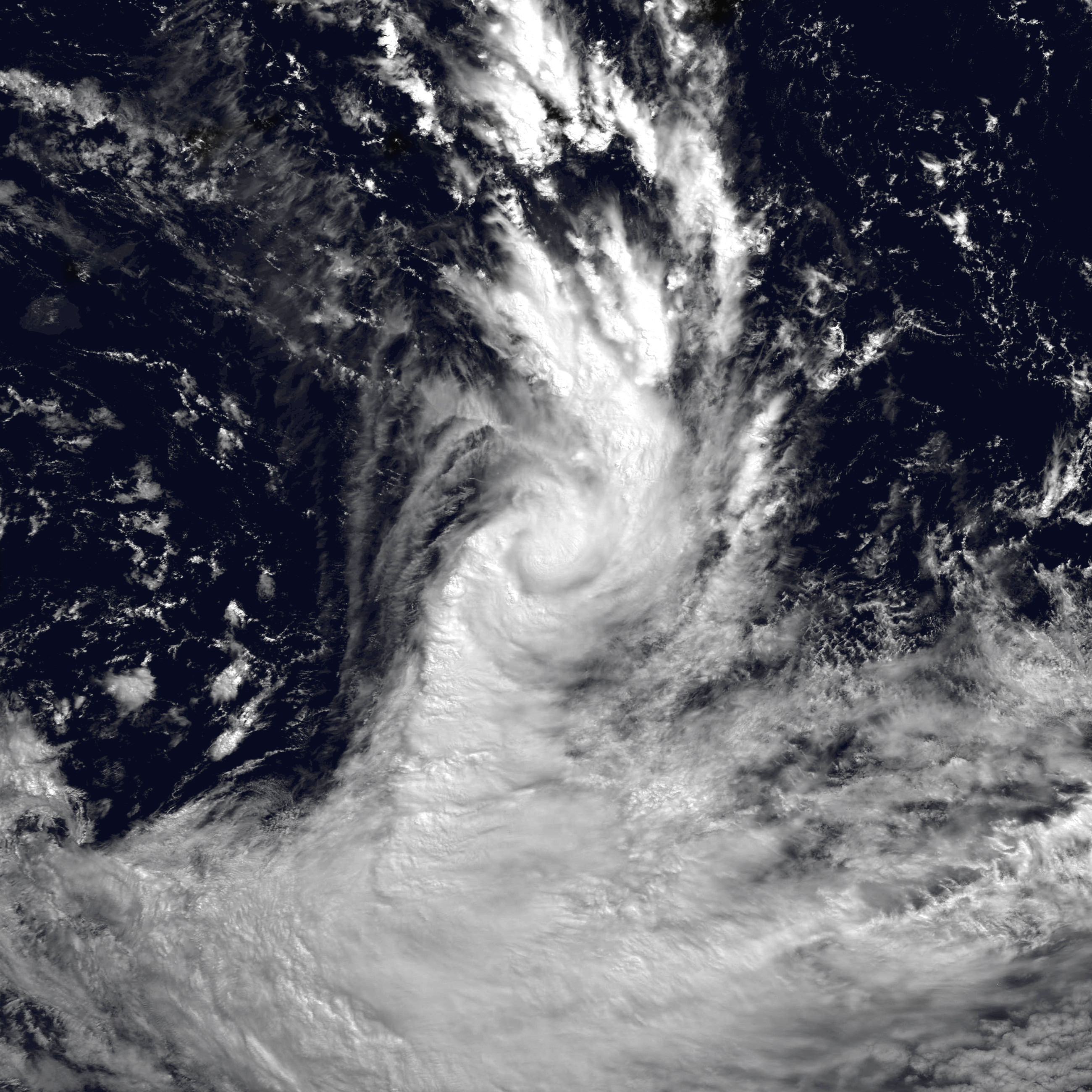
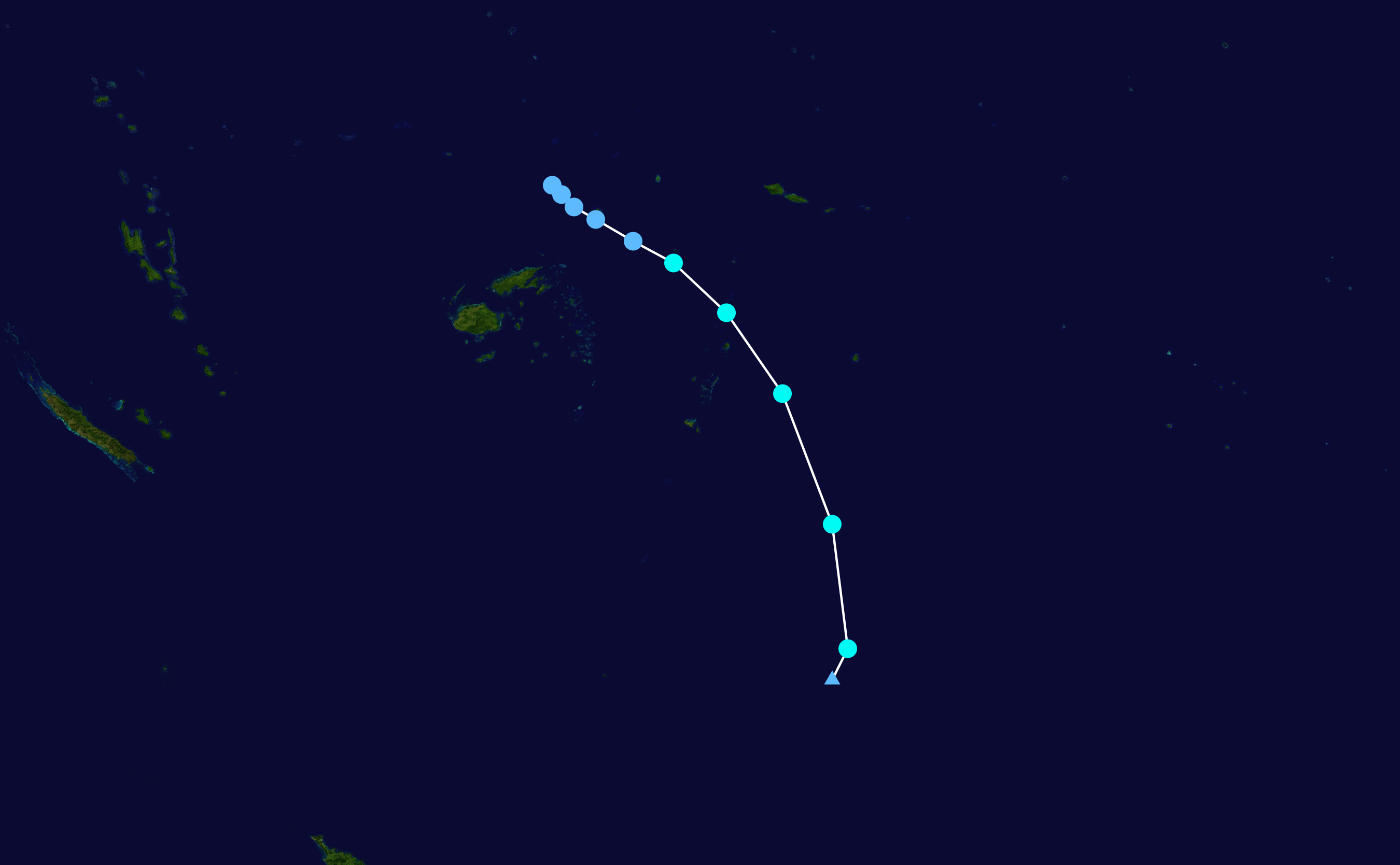
- Duration: April 13 – April 15
- Peak intensity: 95 km/h (60 mph) (10-min); 987 hPa (mbar)

Cyclone Fili formed on April 13 from an area of convection northeast of Fiji. As marginal windshear abated, the disturbance began to organise, and cyclonic rotation was noted. A tropical upper tropospheric trough to the southwest helped enhance upper-level divergence in the system. RSMC Nadi began issuing warnings at 0000 UTC on April 14. Despite forecasts that Fili would merge with an extratropical cyclone, overnight convective organisation improved. Dvorak satellite estimates gave a rating of 3.0, implying winds of 85 km/h (53 mph). The JTWC issued their only warning on Fili at 0600 UTC on April 14. RSMC Nadi named the storm Fili at 1800 UTC on the same day, east-southeast of Tongatapu. At the time, Fili was travelling southeast at 35 km/h (22 mph). During the day a nearby upper-level trough helped accelerate Fili southeast and then southward. However, Fili quickly lost tropical characteristics under intense wind shear, becoming an extratropical cyclone the next day and merging with a cold front by 1200 UTC on March 15. No damage was reported as a result of Fili due to its distance from land masses.

=== Severe Tropical Cyclone Gina ===
- Category 3 severe tropical cyclone (Australian scale)
- Category 2 tropical cyclone (SSHWS)
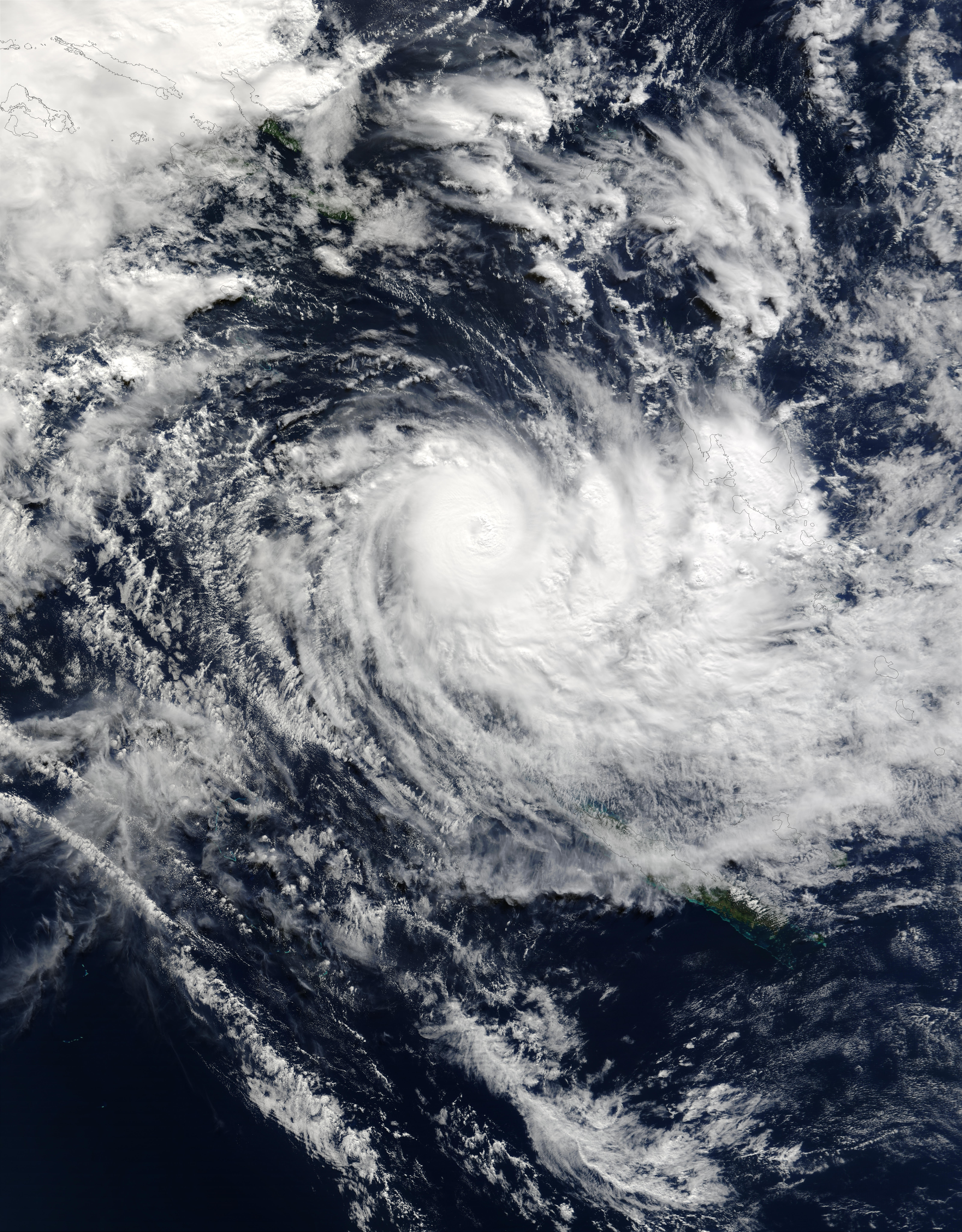
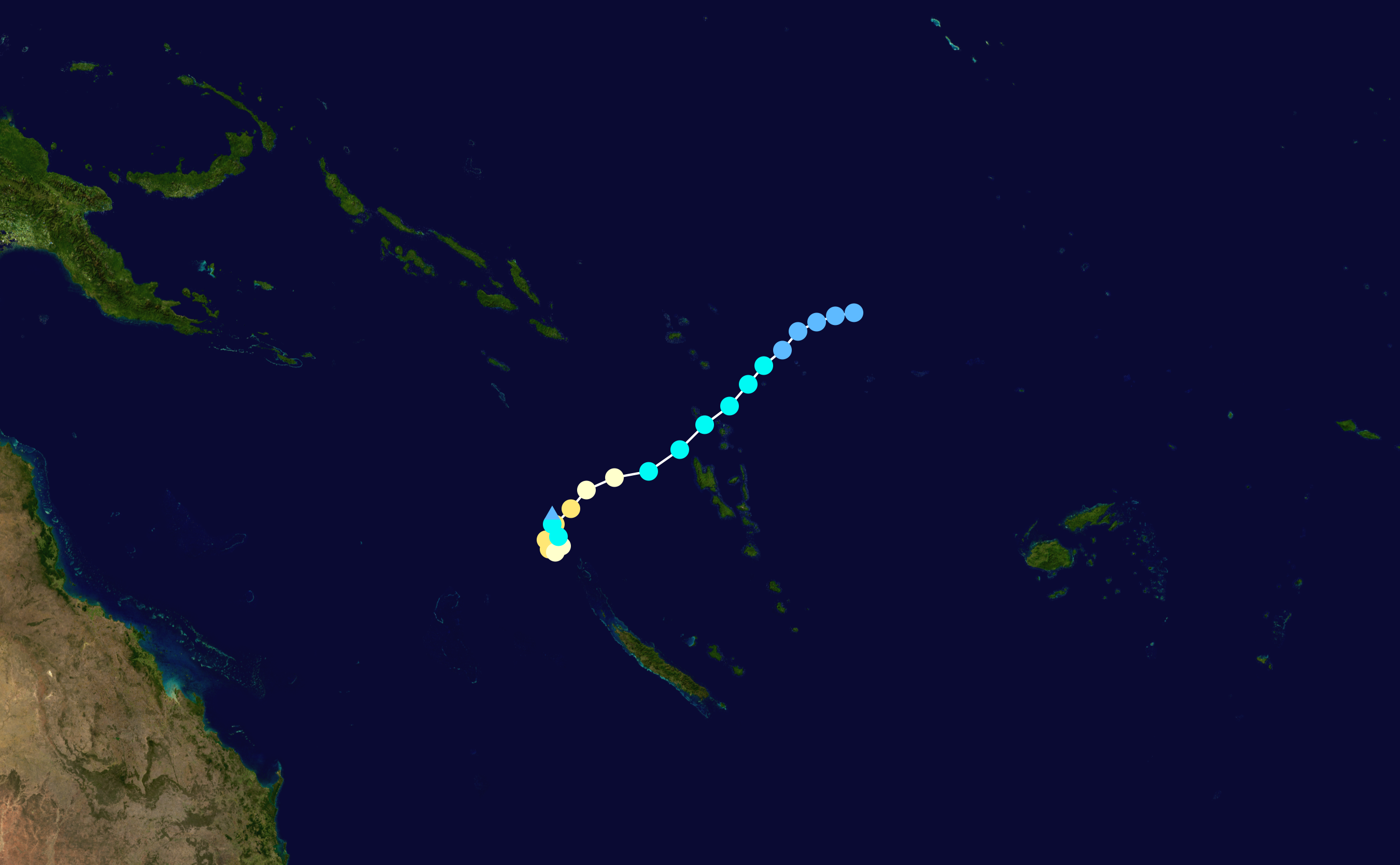
- Duration: June 4 – June 9
- Peak intensity: 150 km/h (90 mph) (10-min); 950 hPa (mbar)

A westward-moving tropical disturbance persisted northeast of Vanuatu, with persistent convection extending toward the Solomon Islands. On June 4, both the JTWC and RSMC Nadi classified the system as a tropical depression. With a ridge to the south, it moved to the west-southwest, quickly intensifying into Tropical Storm Gina by June 5 about 970 km (600 mi) east-southeast of Honiara. By 0000 UTC on June 7, the JTWC upgraded Gina to the equivalent of a minimal hurricane, after an eye became evident on satellite images. Interaction with the nearby remnants of Tropical Cyclone Epi caused convection to decrease. On June 7, FMS reported that Gina attained peak intensity as a low-end Category 3 tropical cyclone on the Australian intensity scale, with winds of 140 km/h (87 mph). The JTWC recorded winds of 170 km/h (110 mph). A compact cyclone with a well-defined eye, Gina encountered stronger wind shear and cooler waters. After turning southeast and then east-southeast in response to a rapidly approaching trough, Gina quickly deteriorated as the convection became displaced from the centre. By June 9, the centre became uncertain as Gina stalled to the west-northwest of Port Vila. Winds diminished below gale force the next day.

Gina struck the island of Tikopia that had already sustained catastrophic damage from Cyclone Zoe less than two months previously. The storm brought high winds and torrential rains that triggered landslides. Dozens of homes were damaged and many areas newly re-planted after Cyclone Zoe were devastated again. The impacts of Gina reportedly set back recovery efforts by nearly six months. A total of 112 newly built houses and 128 newly built kitchens were severely damaged, and another 37 homes sustained minor damage. The newly planted winter crop was lost due to sea spray, and 143 bags of rice, given as relief supplies after Cyclone Zoe, were lost. Following the storm, additional relief supplies and food were rushed to residents to ensure their safety. These consisted of local foods, sago and mesh wiring, worth $14,400. A ship carrying five people became stranded in the Coral Sea during the storm when their engine failed on June 7. A mayday signal was put out by the captain but rough seas produced by the storm hampered rescue efforts. The five were safely rescued later that day, but two more people were discovered to be missing.

=== Other systems ===
During the opening days of the tropical cyclone year 2002–03, a westerly wind burst occurred and lead to the formation of Typhoon Chataan and Tropical Depression 17F. The system was first noted as a tropical depression during July 3, while it was located about 800 km (495 mi) to the northwest of Honiara in the Solomon Islands of Guadalcanal. Over the next couple of days the system moved westwards before it was last noted during July 5. During October 21, Tropical Disturbance 01F developed about 410 km (250 mi) to the northwest of Port Vila, Vanuatu. It moved southeast and developed into a poorly organised tropical depression. It remained disorganized and accelerated towards the southeast, and was last noted by RSMC Nadi at 1800 UTC on October 22. On December 10, RSMC Nadi reported that Tropical Disturbance 03F had developed within a trough of low pressure, about 635 km (395 mi) to the northeast of Pago-Pago on the American Samoan island of Tutuila. The depression drifted towards the south, and was classified as a tropical depression the next day. Further development of the depression was prevented by dry air wrapping into the system and vertical windshear displacing convection. The depression was no longer monitored by RSMC Nadi on December 15 after it had become sheared, but it was briefly referred to as a "weak tropical depression" on December 19 and 20.

On January 30, the poorly organised Tropical Disturbance 08F developed within a convergence zone about 325 km (202 mi) to the northeast of Apia on the Samoan island of Upolu. Over the next few days the system remained weak and poorly organized, and was classified as a tropical depression during February 5. The depression then moved westwards, before dissipating on February 9. Tropical Disturbance 10F developed on February 15, about 170 km (110 mi) to the north of the Fijian Dependency of Rotuma Island. The system was poorly defined and disorganised, while convection surrounding the system was mostly confined to the southern and eastern flanks of the low level circulation. Over the next few days the disturbance remained weak and was last noted during February 21, while nestled within the Solomon Islands. On March 6, Tropical Depression 11F developed under an upper trough of low pressure about 220 km (140 mi) to the northeast of Nadi, Fiji. Convection surrounding the depression was displaced to the north of the low level circulation center. The depression remained weak over the next couple of days, and was last noted during March 8. A fairly disorganized tropical disturbance developed during April 6, within a monsoonal convergence zone, about 236 km (147 mi) to the northeast of Port Vila, Vanuatu. It was initially located within an area of weak vertical windshear, but was expected to move into an area of stronger vertical windshear over the following 24 hours and gradually become extratropical. During the next day, as the disturbance moved southwards, it was assigned the designation 14F, before it was dropped by RSMC Nadi during April 8, as convection surrounding the system became sheared and displaced. On April 13, Tropical Disturbance 15F developed within a monsoon trough, about 355 km (221 mi) to the southeast of Apia, Samoa. The system moved towards the south, with convection surrounding it poorly organised, and displaced to the north of the depression's low level circulation centre. The depression was then last noted, during the next day as Tropical Depression 16F developed into Tropical Cyclone Fili.

== Seasonal effects ==
Name	Dates	Peak intensity			Areas affected	Damage (USD)	Deaths	Ref(s).
Name	Dates	Category	Wind speed	Pressure	Areas affected	Damage (USD)	Deaths	Ref(s).
17F	July 3–5	Tropical depression	45 km/h (28 mph)	999 hPa (29.50 inHg)	None	None	None	
01F	October 21–22	Tropical depression	45 km/h (28 mph)	1,002 hPa (29.59 inHg)	None	None	None	
Yolande	November 29 – December 6	Category 1 tropical cyclone	65 km/h (40 mph)	995 hPa (29.38 inHg)	Tonga	None	None	
03F	December 10–13	Tropical depression	55 km/h (34 mph)	1,002 hPa (29.59 inHg)	None	None	None	
Zoe	December 23 – January 1	Category 5 severe tropical cyclone	240 km/h (150 mph)	890 hPa (26.28 inHg)	Solomon Islands, Vanuatu, Fiji	Severe	None	
Ami	January 9–15	Category 3 severe tropical cyclone	150 km/h (93 mph)	950 hPa (28.05 inHg)	Tuvalu, Fiji, Tonga	$51.2 million	17	
Beni	January 20 – January 31	Category 5 severe tropical cyclone	205 km/h (127 mph)	920 hPa (27.17 inHg)	Solomon Islands, Vanuatu, New Caledonia, Australia	$1 million	1	
Cilla	January 27–29	Category 1 tropical cyclone	75 km/h (47 mph)	995 hPa (29.38 inHg)	Fiji, Tonga	Minimal	None	
08F	January 30 – February 8	Tropical depression	30 km/h (19 mph)	1,002 hPa (29.59 inHg)	None	None	None	
Dovi	February 5–11	Category 5 severe tropical cyclone	205 km/h (127 mph)	920 hPa (27.17 inHg)	Cook Islands	Minimal	None	
10F	February 15–21	Tropical disturbance	Not specified	998 hPa (29.47 inHg)	None	None	None	
11F	March 6–8	Tropical depression	Not specified	998 hPa (29.47 inHg)	None	None	None	
Eseta	March 10–14	Category 4 severe tropical cyclone	185 km/h (115 mph)	930 hPa (27.46 inHg)	Fiji	$876,239	None	
Erica	March 12–14	Category 5 severe tropical cyclone	215 km/h (134 mph)	915 hPa (27.02 inHg)	Queensland, Solomon Islands, Vanuatu, New Caledonia	$15 million	2	
14F	April 6–8	Tropical disturbance	Not specified	998 hPa (29.47 inHg)	None	None	None	
15F	April 15–16	Tropical Disturbance	Not specified	Not specified	None	None	None	
Fili	April 27–29	Category 2 tropical cyclone	95 km/h (59 mph)	987 hPa (29.15 inHg)	Tonga	None	None	
Gina	June 4–9	Category 3 severe tropical cyclone	150 km/h (93 mph)	950 hPa (28.05 inHg)	Solomon Islands	None	None	
Season Aggregates
18 systems	July 3, 2002 – June 9, 2003		240 km/h (150 mph)	890 hPa (26.28 inHg)		>$68.1 million	20	

== See also ==
- List of Southern Hemisphere tropical cyclone seasons
- Atlantic hurricane seasons: 2002, 2003
- Pacific hurricane seasons: 2002, 2003
- Pacific typhoon seasons: 2002, 2003
- North Indian Ocean cyclone seasons: 2002, 2003
- List of off-season South Pacific tropical cyclones
