= CILA-FM =

Canadian Catholic radio station

Coordinates: 45°24′47″N 71°38′00″W

- Cookshire-Eaton, Quebec; Canada
- Frequency: 88.1 MHz (FM)

Programming
- Format: Christian radio

Ownership
- Owner: Roman Catholic Archdiocese of Sherbrooke; (Fabrique de la Paroisse Saint-Camille-de-Cookshire)

History
- First air date: 1995

Technical information
- Class: LP
- ERP: 1 W

CILA-FM is a Canadian radio station that broadcasts religious programming at 88.1 FM in Cookshire-Eaton, Quebec. The station was licensed in 1995 and is owned by the Roman Catholic Archdiocese of Sherbrooke through la Fabrique de la Paroisse Saint-Camille-de-Cookshire.
