= Typhoon Lupit (2003) =

Pacific typhoon in 2003

Typhoon Lupit (Yoyoy)
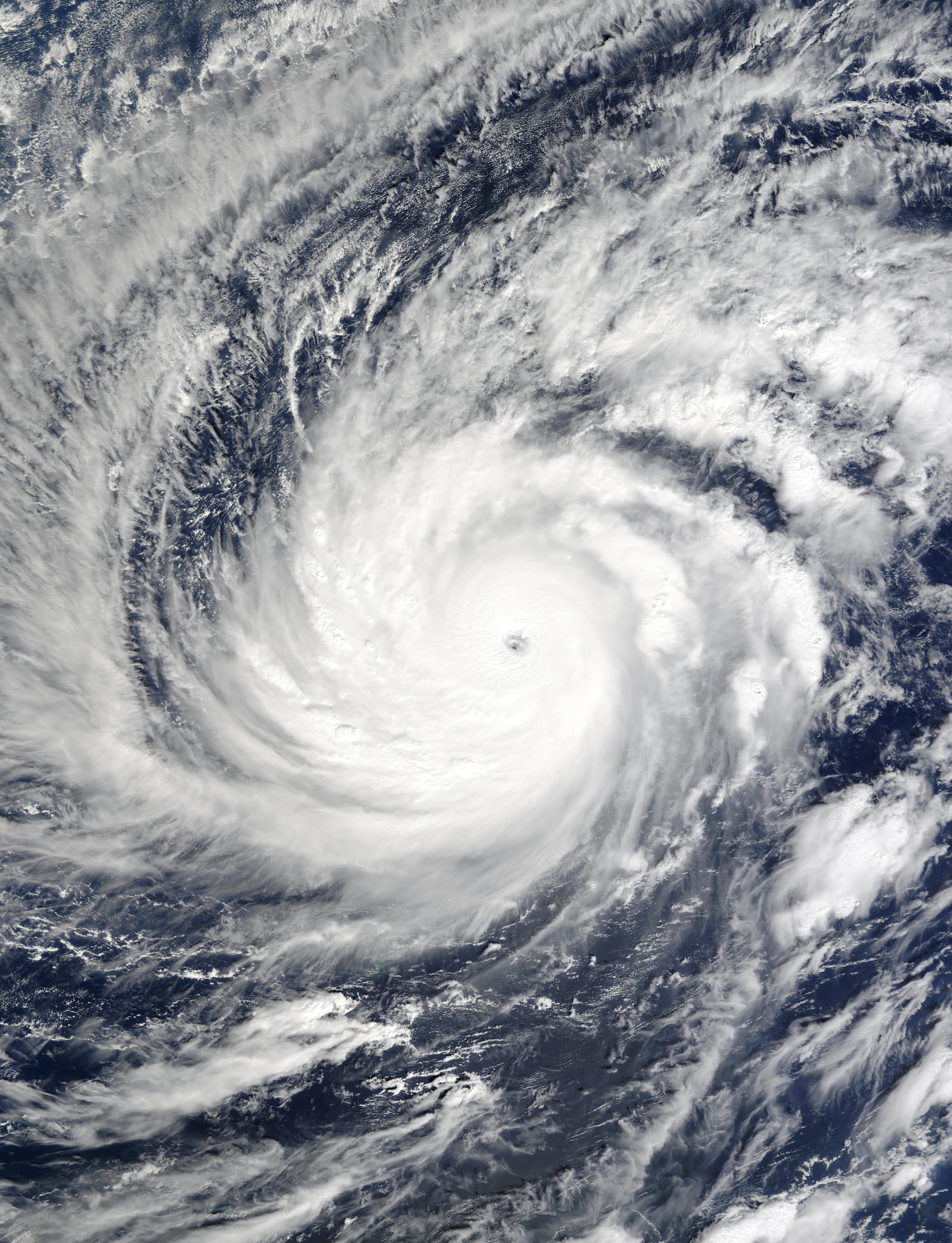
- Typhoon Lupit near peak intensity on November 26

Meteorological history
- Formed: November 18, 2003
- Extratropical: December 2, 2003
- Dissipated: December 4, 2003

Very strong typhoon
- 10-minute sustained (JMA)
- Highest winds: 185 km/h (115 mph)
- Lowest pressure: 915 hPa (mbar); 27.02 inHg

Category 5-equivalent super typhoon
- 1-minute sustained (SSHWS/JTWC)
- Highest winds: 270 km/h (165 mph)
- Lowest pressure: 892 hPa (mbar); 26.34 inHg

Overall effects
- Fatalities: None reported
- Damage: $1.7 million (2003 USD)
- Areas affected: Federated States of Micronesia, Japan
- IBTrACS
- Part of the 2003 Pacific typhoon season

Typhoon Lupit, (Note: The name Lupit (Tagalog: lupit, [lʊˈpɪt̚]) was contributed by the Philippines and means "cruelty, brutality" in Tagalog.) known in the Philippines as Typhoon Yoyoy, destroyed the food supply in several small islands in Yap State in the Federated States of Micronesia (FSM) in late November 2003. It formed on November 18, 2003, from the monsoon trough to the west of the Marshall Islands. Early in its duration, it moved generally to the west or west-southwest. On November 21, the depression intensified into Tropical Storm Lupit, the 21st storm named by the Japan Meteorological Agency of the 2003 Pacific typhoon season. Two days later, it strengthened into a typhoon and developed an eye. Lupit later began a prolonged movement to the northwest, during which it passed near several islands in Yap State. The typhoon reached peak intensity on November 26, with peak 10-minute sustained winds of 185 km/h (115 mph). (Note: The Japan Meteorological Agency uses 10-minute sustained winds, while the Joint Typhoon Warning Center uses 1-minute sustained winds. The conversion factor between the two is 1.14.) It later weakened due to increasing wind shear and drier air, and after recurving to the northeast, Lupit became extratropical south of Japan on December 2.

Typhoon Lupit first affected Pohnpei with tropical storm-force winds, and later it damaged or destroyed about 200 homes in Chuuk State. There, high waves flooded roads and homes, while high winds damaged crops. Damage was heaviest in Yap State, mostly in the small Ulithi atoll and Fais Island. On both islands, the typhoon contaminated the water supply and wrecked crops. Rainfall reached 263 mm (10.4 in) on Ulithi, and gusts reached 158 km/h (98 mph). Throughout the FSM, damage totaled about $1.7 million, (Note: All damage totals are in 2003 United States dollars.) although there were no deaths. The damage prompted the FSM government to declare two states as disaster areas, as well as a disaster declaration from the United States federal government. While Lupit was becoming extratropical, it became the first typhoon in December to threaten Japan in 13 years. There, the storm dropped rainfall that resulted in mudslides and flight cancellations.

== Meteorological history ==
Map plotting the storm's track and intensity, according to the Saffir–Simpson scale Map key Saffir–Simpson scale Tropical depression (≤38 mph, ≤62 km/h) Tropical storm (39–73 mph, 63–118 km/h) Category 1 (74–95 mph, 119–153 km/h) Category 2 (96–110 mph, 154–177 km/h) Category 3 (111–129 mph, 178–208 km/h) Category 4 (130–156 mph, 209–251 km/h) Category 5 (≥157 mph, ≥252 km/h) Unknown Storm type Tropical cyclone Subtropical cyclone Extratropical cyclone, remnant low, tropical disturbance, or monsoon depression

The origins of Typhoon Lupit were from a tropical disturbance that persisted in the monsoon trough on November 14 to the northeast of Kwajalein Atoll. There was a weak circulation with pulsating convection (thunderstorms) and weak outflow. The system drifted to the southwest without much organization. On November 17, the circulation intensified, although convection was initially unable to persist. The next day, outflow increased to the northeast, and the thunderstorms developed over the center. At around 1200 UTC on November 18, the Japan Meteorological Agency (JMA) (Note: The Japan Meteorological Agency is the official Regional Specialized Meteorological Center for the western Pacific Ocean.) classified the system as a tropical depression to the west of the Marshall Islands. Due to low wind shear, the Joint Typhoon Warning Center (JTWC) (Note: The Joint Typhoon Warning Center is a joint United States Navy – United States Air Force task force that issues tropical cyclone warnings for the western Pacific Ocean and other regions.) issued a tropical cyclone formation alert, indicating that tropical cyclogenesis was likely. Late on November 19, the JTWC issued its first advisory on Tropical Depression 26W when the system was about 465 km (289 mi) east-northeast of Pohnpei.

With a ridge located to the north, the depression tracked to the west-southwest upon forming. Late on November 20, the JTWC upgraded the depression to a tropical storm following an increase in deep convection, although the thunderstorms were located south of the center. After it turned more to the west, the JMA upgraded the depression to Tropical Storm Lupit to the northwest of Pohnpei on November 21. Outflow gradually increased, and an eye feature was evident by November 22. Around that time, Lupit passed about 165 km (103 mi) north of Chuuk. Based on the development of a 30 km (19 mi) eye, the JTWC upgraded Lupit to a typhoon that day, and the JMA followed suit on November 23 when the storm was near the Caroline Islands. While the typhoon was intensifying, it briefly turned to the west-southwest on November 23, before a strengthening ridge to the southeast turned Lupit to the northwest. The eye gradually became better-defined as the typhoon strengthened, and it passed well to the south of Guam. On November 25, Lupit passed about 400 km (250 mi) north of Yap in the Federated States of Micronesia (FSM). The next day, the JTWC upgraded the system to a super typhoon, or a storm with maximum 1-minute sustained winds of 305 km/h (190 mph). On November 26, the JMA estimated that Lupit attained peak 10‑minute winds of 185 km/h (115 mph) in the Philippine Sea, and the next day the JTWC estimated peak 1‑minute winds of 270 km/h (170 mph). On November 27, the Philippine Atmospheric, Geophysical and Astronomical Services Administration classified the system as Super Typhoon "Yoyoy" after the storm entered the agency's area of warning responsibility.

While around peak intensity, Typhoon Lupit had good outflow channels to the north and south. It had a 26 km (16 mi) eye, and gale-force winds reached a diameter of more than 740 km (460 mi). After peaking in intensity, Lupit underwent an eyewall replacement cycle, which caused the outflow to decrease and convection around the eye to diminish. Steady weakening began on November 28, accelerated by increasing wind shear, and late that day it weakened below super typhoon status. Lupit entered a weakness in the subtropical ridge, resulting in a turn to the north and later northeast into an area of cooler waters and drier air. The typhoon accelerated into the westerlies, and dry air entered the circulation while the convection rapidly diminished. While moving northeast off the southeast coast of Japan, Lupit weakened into a tropical storm on December 1. That day, the JTWC issued its last advisory on the storm, and the JMA declared Lupit as an extratropical cyclone on December 2. The next day, Lupit dissipated off the east coast of Japan.

== Impact ==
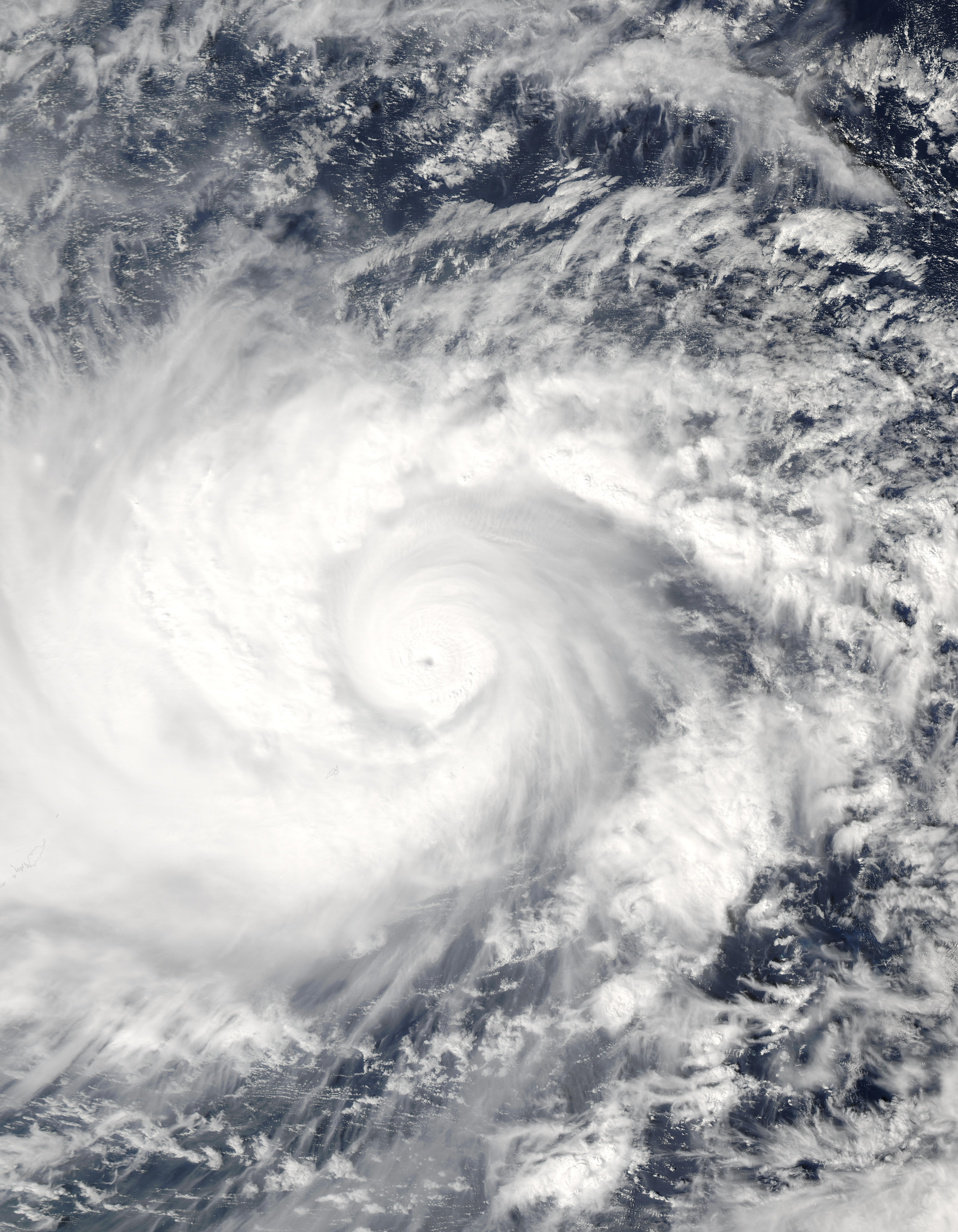
Typhoon Lupit intensifying near the Caroline Islands on November 25

While it was first intensifying as a tropical storm, Lupit affected Pohnpei, passing about 120 km (75 mi) north of Oroluk. Wind gusts peaked at 69 km/h (43 mph), and the storm dropped 160 mm (6.3 in) of rainfall. Later, the storm affected Chuuk Atoll in the FSM on November 23. Tropical storm force winds were experienced through the state, and rainfall reached 162 mm (6.4 in) on Chuuk and 195 mm (7.7 in) on Ulul. The Chuuk state government helped people in low-lying areas to evacuate. High waves flooded homes, and damaged roads and seawalls. About 200 houses were damaged or destroyed, and many homes affected by the typhoon had unsanitary conditions, a contaminated water supply, or lack of food. High winds downed banana and palm trees, and salt water damaged or wrecked all of the food crops in Chuuk.

Most of Yap State was affected by the typhoon, and the eye of Typhoon Lupit passed near the small atoll of Ulithi. The typhoon also passed near Fais, producing estimated gusts of over 185 km/h (115 mph). On both islands, Lupit produced waves of 4.2 to 5.5 m (14 to 18 ft), causing severe beach erosion, and sea spray and flooding contaminated water supplies. In Fais, there was little flooding because it is an elevated island, although several buildings were damaged, mostly to roofs. On Ulithi, areas along the coast were flooded up to 1.5 m (4.9 ft) deep. Crops were wrecked on both islands, and on Ulithi, it was estimated that the soil would be unfit for growing for at least a year. Stations on Ulithi reported wind gusts of 158 km/h (98 mph), and 263 mm (10.4 in) of rainfall. Lupit affected other islands in Yap State with coastal flooding of around 1 m (3.3 ft), severe beach erosion, and wrecked crops. Several islands' water supply were contaminated. On Woleai, the storm downed trees and power lines, and the runway was closed for a week after being covered with water. Damage in Yap State was least on Yap, where winds gusted to 93 km/h (58 mph) and rainfall totaled 128 mm (5.0 in) in a 24‑hour period. There, Lupit downed trees and damaged crops, while high seas flooded areas. There was moderate beach erosion, and some seawalls and coastal roads were damaged.

Throughout the FSM, Typhoon Lupit caused about $1.7 million in damage, although there were no deaths or serious injuries. After the storm, the governor of the FSM declared Chuuk and Yap states as disaster areas. The government sent water to affected areas via a private airline, although damaged runways prevented 60% of flights from being delivered. A government boat was also used to deliver supplies, but its motor was damaged. After it was repaired, the boat delivered 25,312 litres of water and 730 bags of rice. On December 19, United States President George W. Bush declared Yap State as a federal disaster area, which allocated funds for repairing damaged public buildings and debris removal. FEMA also provided emergency food assistance to nine islands in Yap, including Ulithi and Fais. The United Nations Office for the Coordination of Humanitarian Affairs provided $10,000 for purchasing supplies to the most affected areas. As part of Operation Christmas Drop, Japanese and American Air Force units sent four planes to various islands with various supplies and gifts, including to areas affected by the typhoon.

While Lupit was becoming extratropical, it produced a gust of 133 km/h (83 mph) on the Japanese island of Chichi-jima, and 130 km/h (81 mph) on Hachijō-jima. The storm dropped heavy rainfall across Japan, peaking at 283 mm (11.1 in) in Ōshima Subprefecture. In the Izu Islands, the high rains caused mudslides and flooding that affected eight buildings. Winds reached 83 km/h (52 mph) in Miyake-jima. In Yakushima, five flights were canceled due to the typhoon. Lupit was the first typhoon in 13 years to threaten Japan in the month of December.

== See also ==
- Tropical cyclones in 2003
- Weather of 2003
- Other tropical cyclones named Lupit
- Typhoon Sudal – powerful typhoon in 2004 that caused heavy damage in the FSM
