= Cyclone Ami =

Category 3 South Pacific cyclone in 2003

Severe Tropical Cyclone Ami
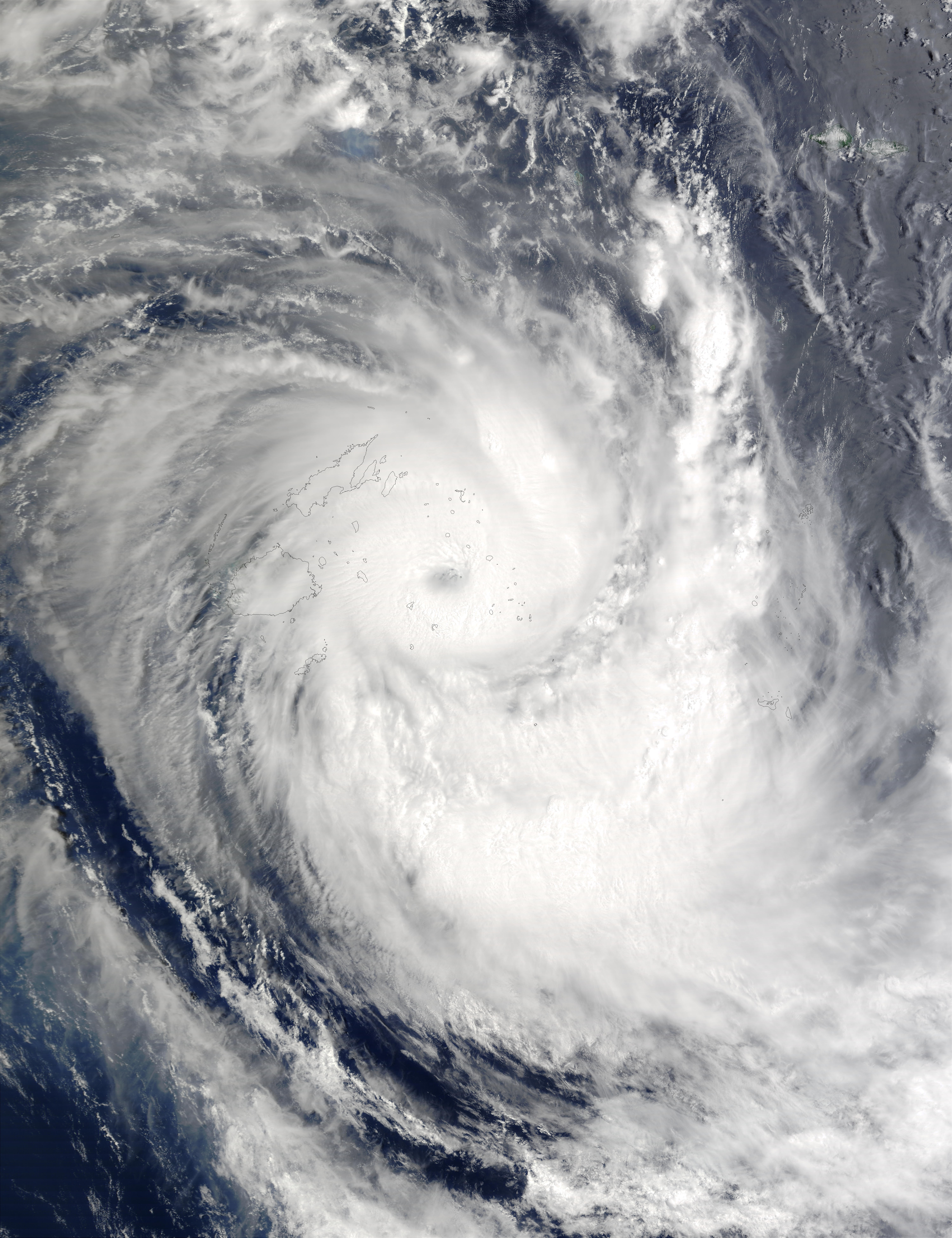
- Satellite image of Cyclone Ami on 13 January

Meteorological history
- Formed: 9 January 2003
- Dissipated: 15 January 2003

Category 3 severe tropical cyclone
- 10-minute sustained (FMS)
- Highest winds: 150 km/h (90 mph)
- Lowest pressure: 950 hPa (mbar); 28.05 inHg

Category 3-equivalent tropical cyclone
- 1-minute sustained (SSHWS/JTWC)
- Highest winds: 205 km/h (125 mph)
- Lowest pressure: 944 hPa (mbar); 27.88 inHg

Overall effects
- Fatalities: 14
- Damage: $51.2 million (2003 USD)
- Areas affected: Fiji, Tuvalu, Tonga
- IBTrACS
- Part of the 2002–03 South Pacific cyclone season

Severe Tropical Cyclone Ami was one of the worst cyclones to affect Fiji. The system was the third cyclone and the second severe tropical cyclone of the 2002–03 South Pacific cyclone season. Cyclone Ami developed from a low-pressure area east of Tuvalu on 12 January. Originally, the storm moved slowly towards the southwest early in its existence. Influenced by an upper-level trough, Ami slowed and began moving towards the south and then southeast. The cyclone attained severe tropical cyclone intensity on 13 January. Ami made its first landfall at Vanua Levu, before subsequently making another landfall on Taveuni. Still intensifying, Ami reached peak intensity as a Category 3 cyclone on the Australian and Fiji cyclone scales on 14 January. Accelerating to the southeast, the cyclone began to cross over cool sea surface temperatures and encountered wind shear. Ami transitioned into an extratropical cyclone the day after.

Cyclone Ami severely impacted areas of Fiji, primarily causing flooding. Numerous landslides and power outages resulted from the heavy rains. Damage was particularly severe in Labasa, Fiji, where floodwater inundated the entire city. Damage sustained to crops was also severe, especially the sugar cane, where production decreased by 15% due to Ami. In Tonga, damage was not as severe. However, two ships offshore were grounded due to the cyclone. Ami caused F$104.4 million (US$51.2 million) (Note: All damage totals in United States Dollars are obtained by converting from FJD using rates as of 15 January 2003.) in damages and 17 deaths, primarily on Fiji. Following the deaths and damage, the name "Ami" was later retired.

== Meteorological history ==
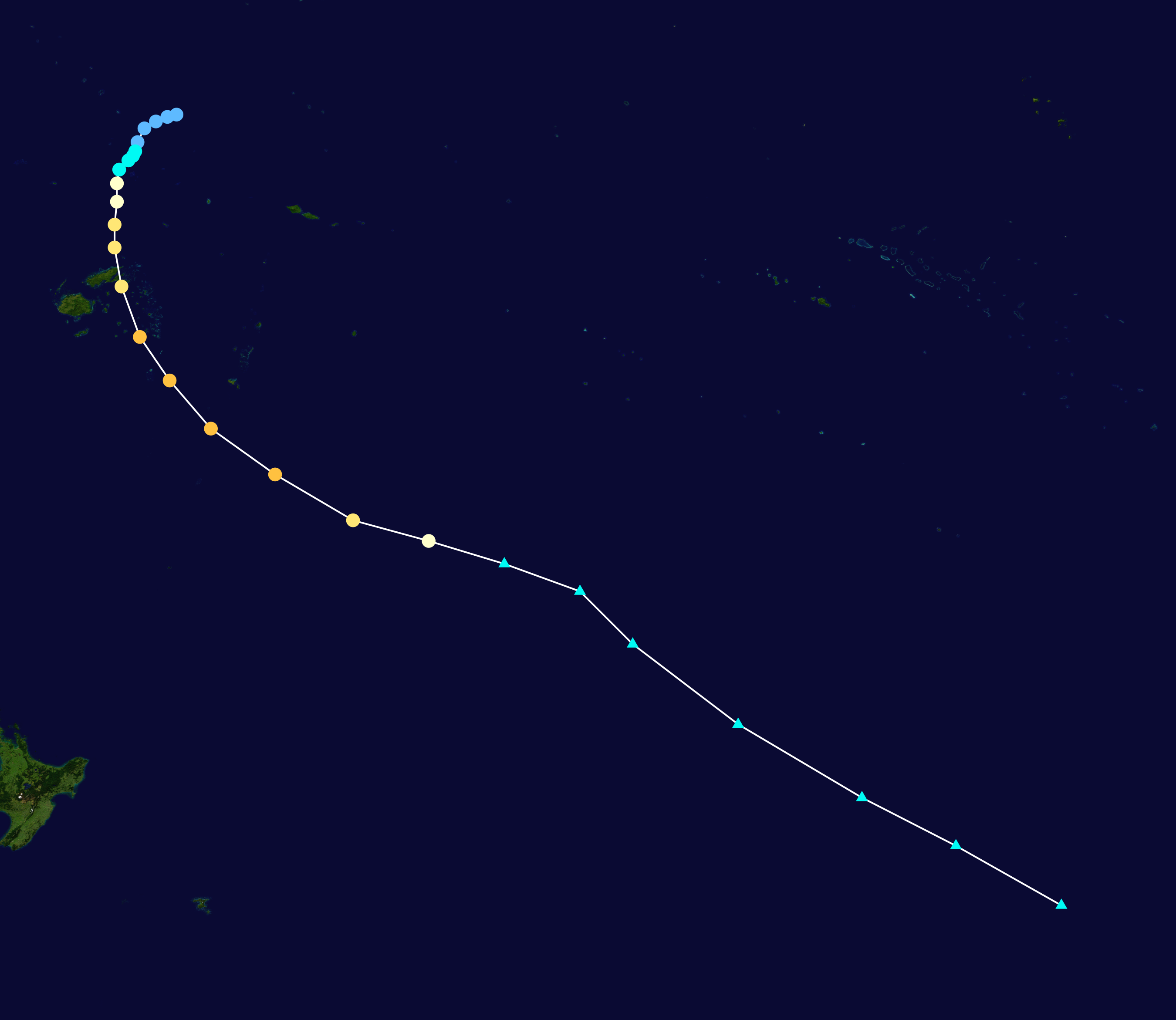
Map plotting the storm's track and intensity, according to the Saffir–Simpson scale Map key Saffir–Simpson scale Tropical depression (≤38 mph, ≤62 km/h) Tropical storm (39–73 mph, 63–118 km/h) Category 1 (74–95 mph, 119–153 km/h) Category 2 (96–110 mph, 154–177 km/h) Category 3 (111–129 mph, 178–208 km/h) Category 4 (130–156 mph, 209–251 km/h) Category 5 (≥157 mph, ≥252 km/h) Unknown Storm type Tropical cyclone Subtropical cyclone Extratropical cyclone, remnant low, tropical disturbance, or monsoon depression

On 9 January 2003, the Fiji Meteorological Service (FMS) started to monitor a weak tropical depression, that had developed within a monsoon trough about 800 km (495 mi) to the northwest of Apia, Samoa. Over the next two days as the system moved towards the southwest further development of the depression was inhibited by strong vertical windshear, before during 11 January, the vertical windshear decreased and the system started to rapidly develop further. As it developed further the United States Joint Typhoon Warning Center issued a tropical cyclone formation alert on the system, before they designated it as Tropical Cyclone 10P later that day as the 1-minute sustained windspeeds became equivalent to a tropical storm. The FMS subsequently reported six hours later that the depression had developed into a category one tropical cyclone on the Australian tropical cyclone intensity scale, and named it as Ami, while it was located just to the east of the southern Tuvalu island of Niulakita.

Tracking southwest, the storm was named Tropical Cyclone Ami at approximately 0000 UTC on 12 January under favorable upper-level diffluence facilitated by the nearby ridge of high pressure. Influenced by an upper-level trough, Ami slowed in forward movement and turned on a more southerly course. With minimal wind shear and a good outflow pattern, Ami achieved severe tropical cyclone intensity at 0600 UTC on 13 January. A poorly defined eye feature became visible on satellite imagery, at which point the storm was situated around 260 km (160 mi) north-northeast of Labasa. The cyclone made landfall on Vanua Levu with a minimum barometric pressure of 960 hPa (28.35 inHg) before subsequently crossing the western tip of Taveuni. Broadly turning toward the southeast, Ami traversed the Lau Islands. While located about 97 km (60 mi) south of Lakeba – at 0600 UTC on 14 January – the storm reached its peak intensity with 10-minute maximum sustained winds of 90 mph (140 km/h) and a pressure of 950 mbar (28 inHg). At the same time, the JTWC assessed the storm with 1-minute winds of 201 km/h (125 mph).

Accelerating toward the southeast with forward speed reaching 64 km/h (40 mph), Ami began to gradually weaken due to resuming wind shear and increasingly cool waters. The cyclone interacted with a frontal boundary, and in doing so it transitioned to an extratropical cyclone. Ami lost all tropical characteristics by 1200 UTC on 15 January, although its remnants continued eastward to a point well south of Rarotonga. On 14 January, RSMC Nadi issued their final advisory on Ami and passed the primary warning responsibility for Cyclone Ami to the Wellington Tropical Cyclone Warning Center (TCWC Wellington) as the system moved below 25 °S.

== Preparations and impact ==
=== Fiji ===
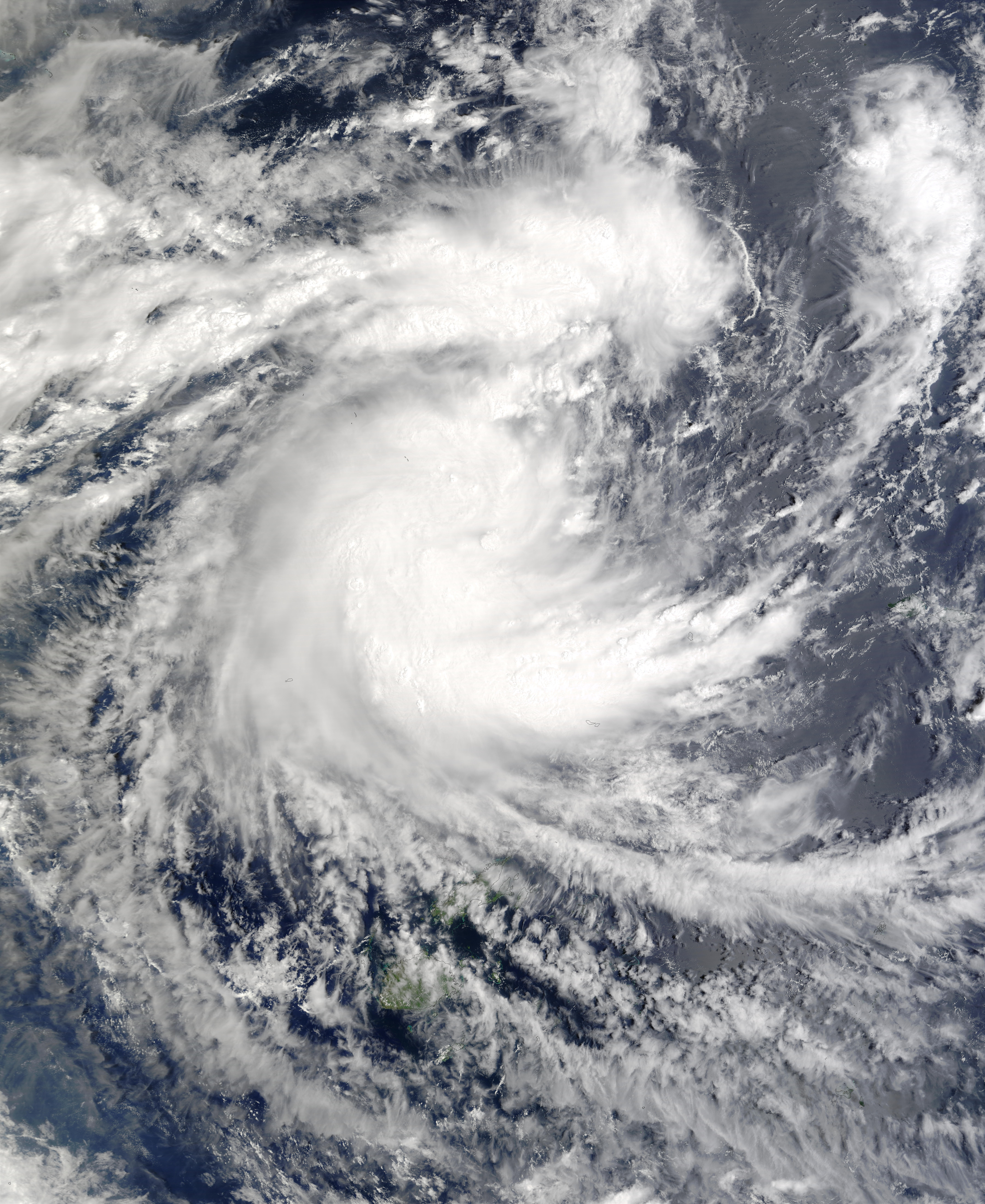
Cyclone Ami strengthening off Fiji on 11 January

Prior to the storm, 30 evacuation shelters were opened. On Lavau Island, residents took shelter in limestone caves to avoid the oncoming storm surge.

After the storm, major damage was recorded to houses, crops, schools across Fiji. Heavy rainfall led to landslides and intensive flooding, and combined with storm surges to give rise to dangerous flash floods. The maximum rainfall total was 311 mm (12.2 in), recorded at the coastal site of Vatuwiri on Taveuni Island. Due to the rugged terrain of the island, the rains resulted in heavy flooding. Power lines were cut off in Vanua Levu, Taveuni, and the Lau Islands, resulting in widespread power outage. In Vanua Levu, damage to crops and bush material were reported. The island was also damaged by strong tidal swells and storm surge. Communications with the island were cut off at approximately 1700 UTC, preventing damage reports from being communicated for a period of time. Labasa, Fiji was inundated under 1.2 m (3.9 ft) of water. The city's morgue could not operate due to damage sustained by Ami. As a result, bodies found in the area had to be cremated. An entire family was reported to have drowned after their house was inundated by rising floodwater. Two children went missing an others were injured when a wooden church on Druadrua Island being used as a shelter collapsed. However, the two children were later found alive in the debris. St. Bede's College in Savusavu was severely damaged by Ami.

Across much of the islands, agricultural damage was widespread. Primarily due to damages sustained on the Fiji Sugar Corporation sugar mill in Labasa, sugar cane production in 2003 dropped by 800,000 tonnes (882,000 short tons), equivalent to 15% less than forecast. Coconut plantations also sustained heavy damages. In Lau Province and Lomaiviti Province, an estimated 158 houses were completely destroyed. In the two provinces, damages totaled to F$4.5 million (US$2.2 million). However, in Macuata, Cakaudrove, and Bua provinces, 2,287 houses were destroyed. In those three provinces, damages were estimated to be F$23.7 million (US$11.6 million).

After Fiji cut water supplies, residents feared that the water would be contaminated with disease and other chemicals. As a result of Ami, F$104.4 million (US$51.2 million) in damages resulted from the cyclone, and 14 people died.

=== Tonga ===
In Tonga, no significant damage was reported, although minor power outages occurred on some islands. Nuku'alofa reported maximum wind speeds of 75 km/h (47 mph). Damage to fruit trees accounted for most of the damage on Tonga. Offshore, however, two ships were grounded, including the Olovaha ferry offshore of Popua Beach, but no fatalities were reported.

== Aftermath ==
A P-3 Orion was sent from New Zealand to investigate the damage caused by Cyclone Ami, departing from Whenuapai. 150 soldiers from the Republic of Fiji Military Forces were on standby in Suva in preparation for sending equipment to affected areas. Fijian patrol boats carrying emergency supplies were also headed for affected regions to provide medical and shelter equipment. The Fiji Red Cross Society (FRCS) provided assistance and emergency supplies to at least 2,000 families affected by the storm. The FRCS focused on provided victims items such as clothing, cooking utensils, and towels. In addition, the World Bank proposed disaster mitigation and adaptation to help reduce flood impact in Fiji. After the cyclone, Vanua Levu was declared a state of emergency (by the Fijian government) and a disaster area. The Cabinet of Fiji later met in Suva, Fiji in order to change the national budget to allocate relief and reconstruction funds.

== See also ==
- Tropical cyclones in 2003
- Weather of 2003
- List of Category 3 South Pacific severe tropical cyclones
- Wettest tropical cyclones in Fiji
- Geography of Fiji
- Cyclone Raja
