= Cyclone Kalunde =

South-West Indian cyclone in 2003

Intense Tropical Cyclone Kalunde
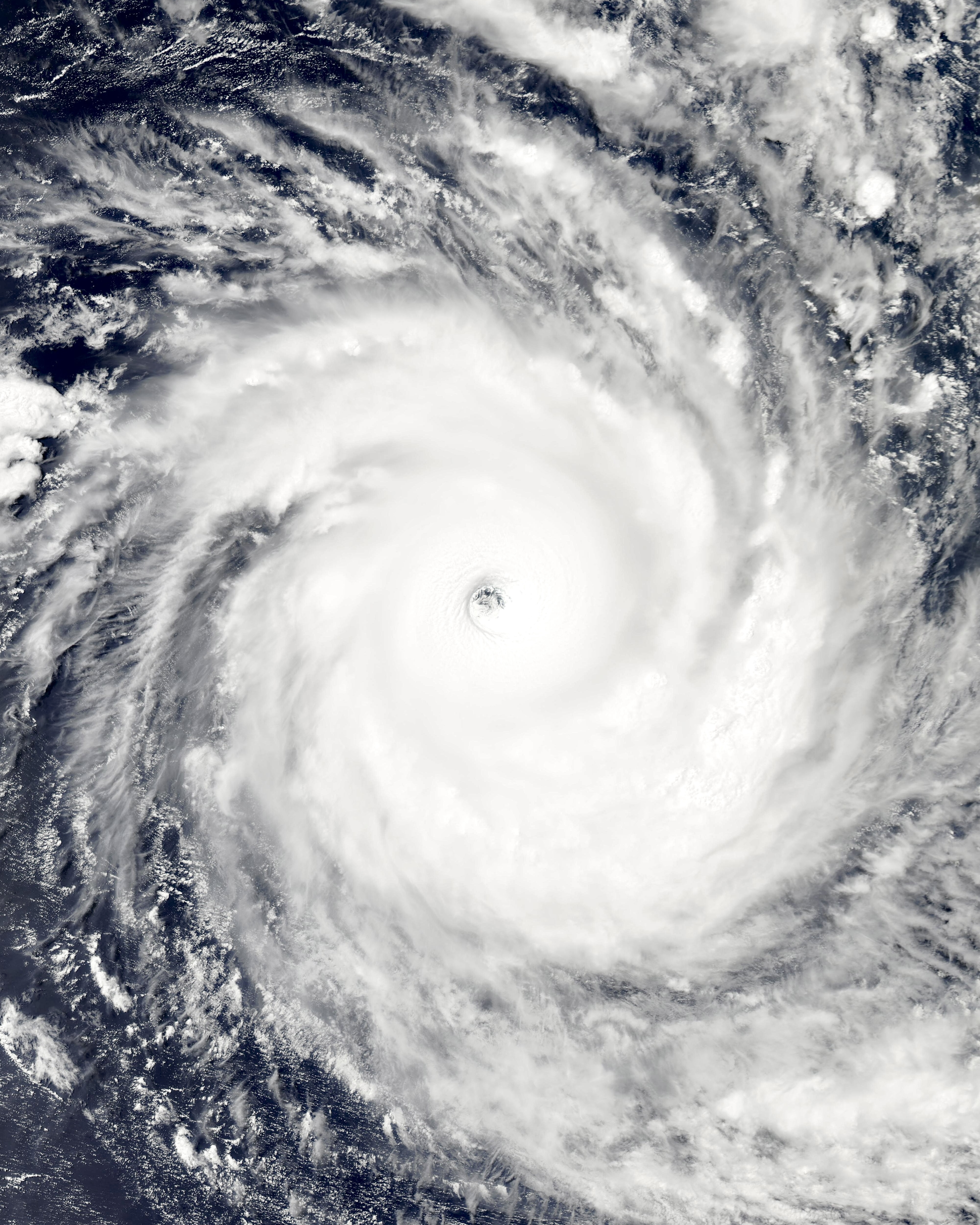
- Kalunde shortly after peak intensity on March 8

Meteorological history
- Formed: March 3, 2003
- Extratropical: March 14
- Dissipated: March 17, 2003

Intense tropical cyclone
- 10-minute sustained (MFR)
- Highest winds: 215 km/h (130 mph)
- Highest gusts: 260 km/h (160 mph)
- Lowest pressure: 910 hPa (mbar); 26.87 inHg

Category 5-equivalent tropical cyclone
- 1-minute sustained (SSHWS/JTWC)
- Highest winds: 260 km/h (160 mph)
- Highest gusts: 305 km/h (190 mph)
- Lowest pressure: 910 hPa (mbar); 26.87 inHg

Overall effects
- Fatalities: None
- Damage: $3.15 million (2003 USD)
- Areas affected: Rodrigues
- IBTrACS
- Part of the 2002–03 South-West Indian Ocean cyclone season

Intense Tropical Cyclone Kalunde was the strongest storm of the 2002–03 South-West Indian Ocean cyclone season. The eleventh named storm and sixth cyclone of the season, Kalunde formed on March 4 from an area of disturbed weather east-southeast of Diego Garcia. The storm steadily strengthened and attained severe tropical storm intensity on March 6. After starting a phase of rapid deepening, Kalunde attained cyclone intensity the next day. Kalunde attained its peak intensity on March 8, as an intense tropical cyclone. It maintained its peak strength for a day; shortly thereafter, the system began to weaken. After undergoing an eyewall replacement cycle, the storm brushed Rodrigues. Shortly after doing so, Kalunde weakened into a tropical cyclone and later a severe tropical storm. Two days later, on March 16, the cyclone transitioned into an extratropical cyclone and dissipated the next day.

Cyclone Kalunde brought US$3.15 million in damage to Rodrigues Island. A total of 1,600 homes and 40 boats were damaged. Severe coastal damage took place across the island; many roads were washed out. Power outages also occurred across the island, delaying residents access to information pertaining to Kalunde. About 80 percent of the drinking water was contaminated and the entire food crop was destroyed. However, no deaths were reported.

== Meteorological history ==
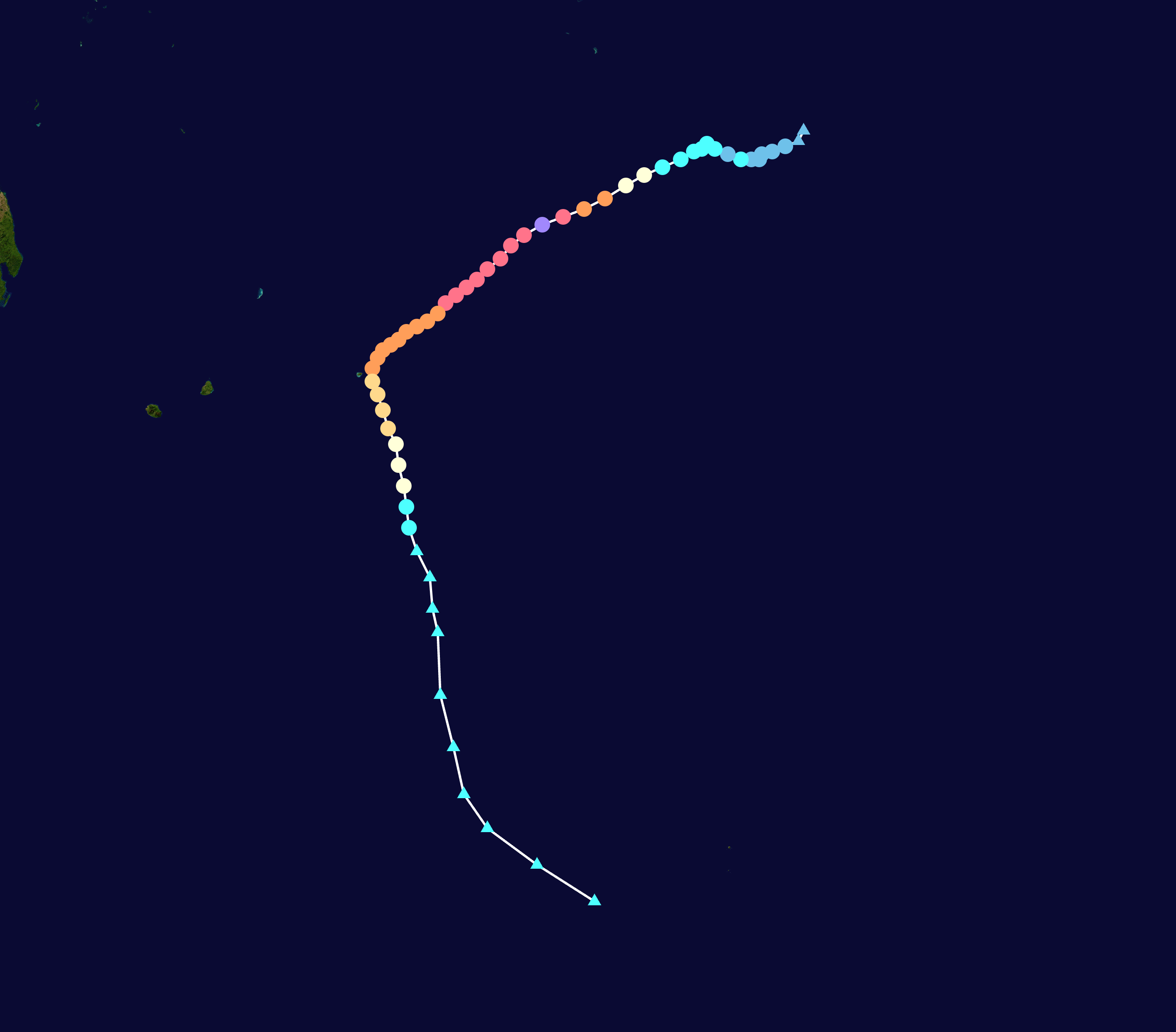
Map plotting the storm's track and intensity, according to the Saffir–Simpson scale Map key Saffir–Simpson scale Tropical depression (≤38 mph, ≤62 km/h) Tropical storm (39–73 mph, 63–118 km/h) Category 1 (74–95 mph, 119–153 km/h) Category 2 (96–110 mph, 154–177 km/h) Category 3 (111–129 mph, 178–208 km/h) Category 4 (130–156 mph, 209–251 km/h) Category 5 (≥157 mph, ≥252 km/h) Unknown Storm type Tropical cyclone Subtropical cyclone Extratropical cyclone, remnant low, tropical disturbance, or monsoon depression

An area of convection developed on March 3 several hundred miles to the east-southeast of Diego Garcia. That day, Météo-France (MFR) issued the first bulletin on Tropical Disturbance 14 while located 580 mi (930 km) east-southeast of Diego Garcia. In an environment of weak to moderate wind shear, MFR upgraded the system to tropical depression status. Later on March 4, the Joint Typhoon Warning Center (JTWC) issued a Tropical Cyclone Formation Alert (TCFA) for the disturbance as shower activity increased, though it initially concentrated west-southwest of the atmospheric circulation. MFR upgraded the depression to moderate tropical storm status at 0600 UTC on March 5; subsequently, the Meteorological Service of Mauritius assigned the system the name Kalunde. Moving west-northwest, the JTWC issued their first warning on the system. Initially, Kalunde did not become much better organized even though deep convection was still increasing. Cyclone Kalunde steadily intensified over the next couple of days while performing a small clockwise loop. MFR upgraded Kalunde to severe tropical storm status at 1200 UTC on March 6. At 1800 UTC, JTWC reported 1-minute sustained winds of 100 km/h (60 mph). On March 7, Kalunde began to undergo rapid intensification, and at 0600 UTC the MFR upgraded it to a tropical cyclone. At the same time, JTWC also estimated winds of 120 km/h (75 mph), the equivalent of a Category 1 hurricane on the Saffir–Simpson hurricane wind scale (SSHWS).

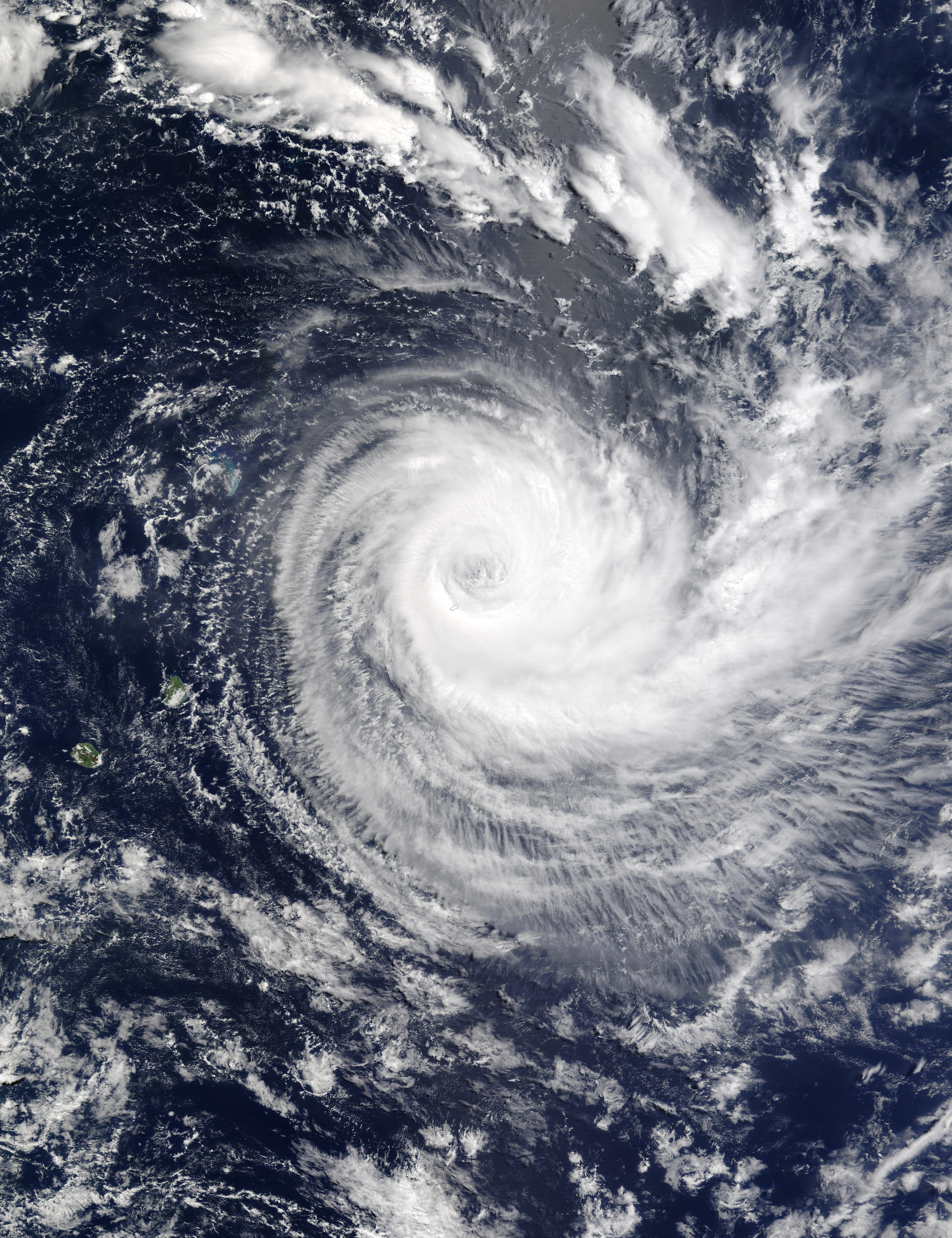
Kalunde undergoing an eyewall replacement cycle on March 12

After the formation of an eye, Kalunde continued to intensify rapidly and at 1800 UTC March 7 MFR declared the system an intense cyclone. Simultaneously, JTWC estimated that Kalunde had attained winds of 215 km/h (135 mph) while located several hundred miles south-southwest of Diego Garcia. Continuing to trek southwest by a mid-level ridge to the southeast, the rapid intensification trend continued until it leveled off early on March 8. At this time, the JTWC reported winds of 255 km/h (160 mph), equivalent to Category 5 intensity on the SSHWS. Subsequently, MFR remarked that the system had reached its peak wind speed of 215 km/h (135 mph), as an intense tropical cyclone. After attaining peak intensity, MFR and the JTWC began to lower their intensity estimates as thunderstorms began to erode in the northwestern quadrant of the eyewall.

Moving slowly southwest, Intense Tropical Cyclone Kalunde underwent an eyewall replacement cyclone late on March 9. The next day, the JTWC notes that Kalunde re-intensified somewhat; however, this is not supported by MFR’s estimates. While slowly approaching the small island of Rodrigues, Kalunde was estimated (according to MFR) to have winds of 140 km/h (85 mph). On March 12, Kalunde passed 55 km (35 mi) away from Rodrigues, and around that time the JTWC reported winds of 100 km/h (60 mph). MFR downgraded Kalunde to severe tropical storm status at 0000 UTC on March 14. Twelve hours later, the center of circulation became exposed from the convection. Kalunde continued trekking south-southeastward on the March 15 as it underwent extratropical transition. The JTWC stopped monitoring the low at 1200 UTC while estimating winds of 55 km/h (35 mph). At 1800 UTC on March 15, MFR declared the system extratropical, located approximately 690 mi (1,110 km) south-southeast of Rodrigues. The agency officially stopped tracking the system at 1200 UTC the next day though the storm finally dissipated on March 17.

== Preparations, impact, and aftermath ==
Prior to the storm's arrival, a class four cyclone alert was issued for Rodrigues Island. Between March 11 and 13, flights to and from Rodrigues were canceled due to high winds. In addition, Cyclone Kalunde briefly posed a threat to Mauritius.

Severe coastal damage took place across Rodrigues. Many roads were washed out, isolating many communities. Wind gusts estimated up to 210 km/h (130 mph) destroyed the island's power and telecommunications grid, leaving the entire populace without power. Communication lines between Rodrigues and nearby Mauritius were also cut. Hospitals were also without electricity; one operation had to be done using a torch light. Because communication was lost during Kalunde's passage, residents lacked information about the storm for several hours. About 80 percent of the drinking water was contaminated and food crop on the island was washed away. During the storm's three-day passage of the island, 329.1 mm (12.96 in) of rain fell. A total of 1,600 homes and 40 boats were damaged and losses across the island amounted to €3.4 million (US$3.15 million).

In the wake of the storm, the French Red Cross supplied 1.5 tons of supplies to approximately 10,000 people victims of Kalunde. Mauritius Deputy Prime Minister Paul Berenger visited the island Friday to assess the damage while another official called on Mauritius officials to contribute to a cyclone relief fund for the island group. Twenty technicians were also sent to the area in wake of the storm. Officials estimated that it would take five weeks for power to be fully restored across Rodrigues. They also stated that if a similar situation took place and people were in need of emergency services, no one would be able to receive them. Furthermore, they proposed that bridges would to be built in order to forestall roads from being washed out again.

== See also ==
- Tropical cyclones in 2003
- Weather of 2003
- Tropical cyclones in the Mascarene Islands
- Cyclone Dina – strong cyclone that affected Mauritius in the previous year
- Cyclone Chris-Damia – cyclone that also affected Rodrigues Island
