= Weather of 2003 =

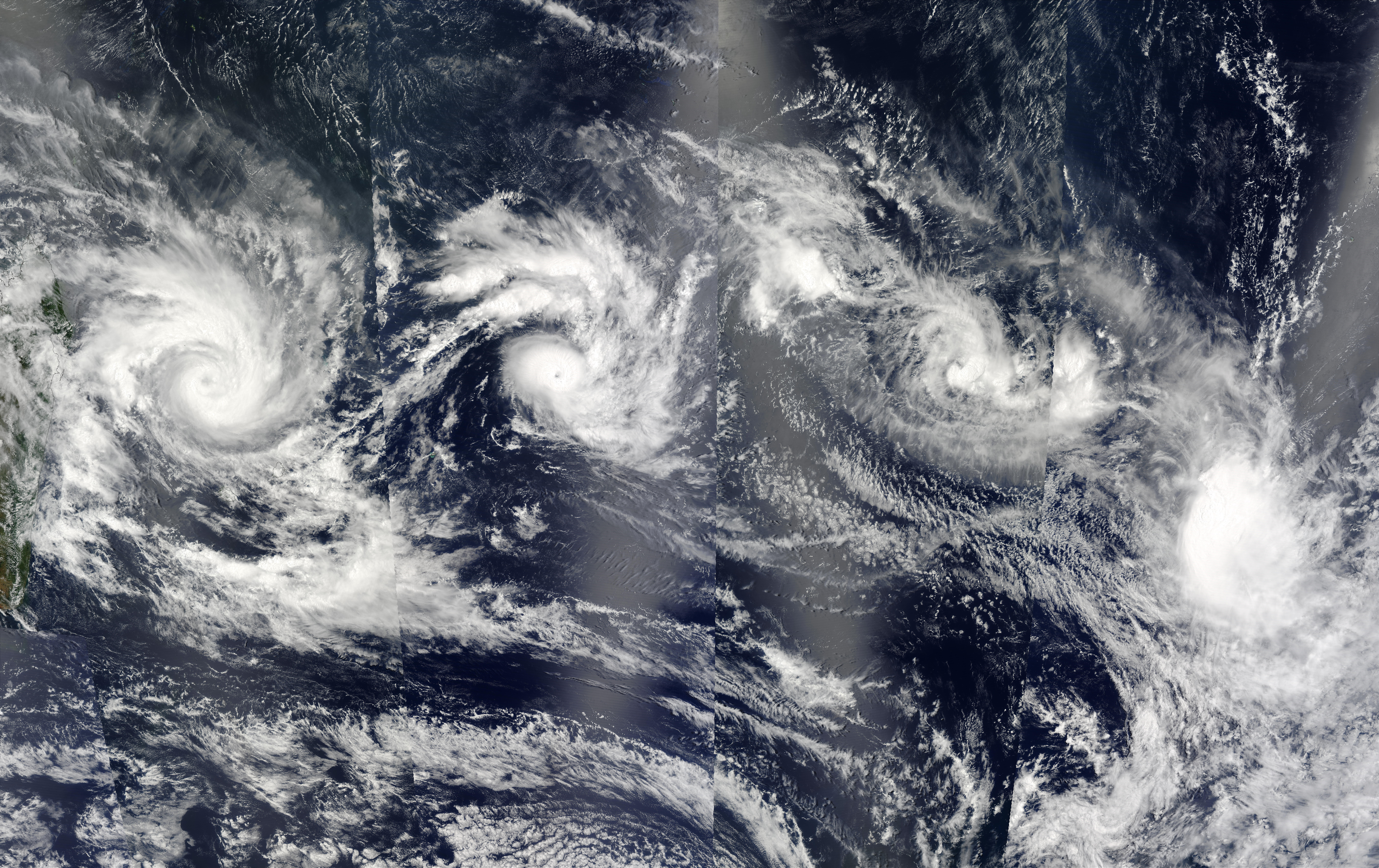
Four tropical storms active on February 12 in the southern Indian Ocean; from left to right are Gerry, Hape, Isha, and Fiona

The following is a list of weather events that occurred on Earth in the year 2003. The most common weather events to have a significant impact are blizzards, cold waves, droughts, heat waves, wildfires, floods, tornadoes, and tropical cyclones. The deadliest event of the year was a European heatwave that killed 72,210 people, which broke several nationwide temperature records.

== Overview ==
The year began with El Niño conditions, which meant that sea surface temperatures over the equator over the eastern Pacific Ocean were anomalously warm.

=== Deadliest events ===
Deadliest meteorological events during 2003
Rank	Event	Date(s)	Deaths (+Missing)	Refs
1	European heatwave	July–August	72,210	
2	Sri Lanka floods	May 10–20	260	
3	Bukit Lawang, Indonesia flash flood	November 12	180	
4	Typhoon Maemi	September 5–16	120	
5	Vietnam floods	October 14–November 14	103	

== Types ==
The following listed different types of special weather conditions worldwide.

=== Cold snaps and winter storms ===
On January 24, an arctic air mass made it into central Florida, causing widespread wind chills in the 20s °F. Winds that helped bring in the colder air also caused wind chill readings to drop in the teens. Those winds also brought in moisture off the Atlantic coast, resulting in snow flurries and ocean effect snow along the coastlines of Volusia and Brevard counties. Daytona Beach set the record for the coldest minimum and maximum temperature, at 25 °F (−4 °C), and at 37 °F (3 °C), respectively. In February, a historic blizzard dumped unusually heavy snowfall across New England and the Northeastern United States on Presidents' Day weekend. Many locations saw over 2 feet (61 cm) of snow. Nearly the entire state of Massachusetts, southern New England and southern New York saw 1 foot (30.5 cm) of snow. Central Park received 19.8 inches (50.3 cm) from the storm, making February 2003 the fourth snowiest February in the park, with the entire month seeing 26.1 inches (66.3 cm). Boston received 27.5 inches (69.8 cm), the largest total for the city. 10 deaths were attributed to the storm. From March 17–19, a powerful blizzard affected Colorado, which is the second biggest snowstorm ever to hit Denver. 3 feet (91 cm) of snow fell in Denver and more than 7 feet (210 cm) fell in the foothills. Other snow reports include 87.5 inches (222 cm) at Rollinsville, 77.5 inches (197 cm) at Winter Park, 50 inches (130 cm) near Golden, and 40.3 inches (102 cm) in Aurora. Denver International Airport shut down, stranding 4,000 passengers, and Colorado traffic was shut down as roads and interstates were shut down. Building collapses were also reported due to the weight of the heavy snow.

=== Floods ===
A low pressure system combined with the remnants of a tropical storm brought plenty of moisture to cause heavy rain over central Indiana on September 1. In a period of 24 hours, 6–8 inches (150–200 mm) of rain fell, causing widespread flash flooding across the region. There were widespread evacuations from homes, rescues from vehicles, and many schools had to close. The National Guard was activated to assist with road closings and rescues in Indianapolis. The White River came up 15 ft (4.6 m) in 18 hours after the rain ended. Flood damage was estimated in excess of $20 million.

=== Heat waves and droughts ===
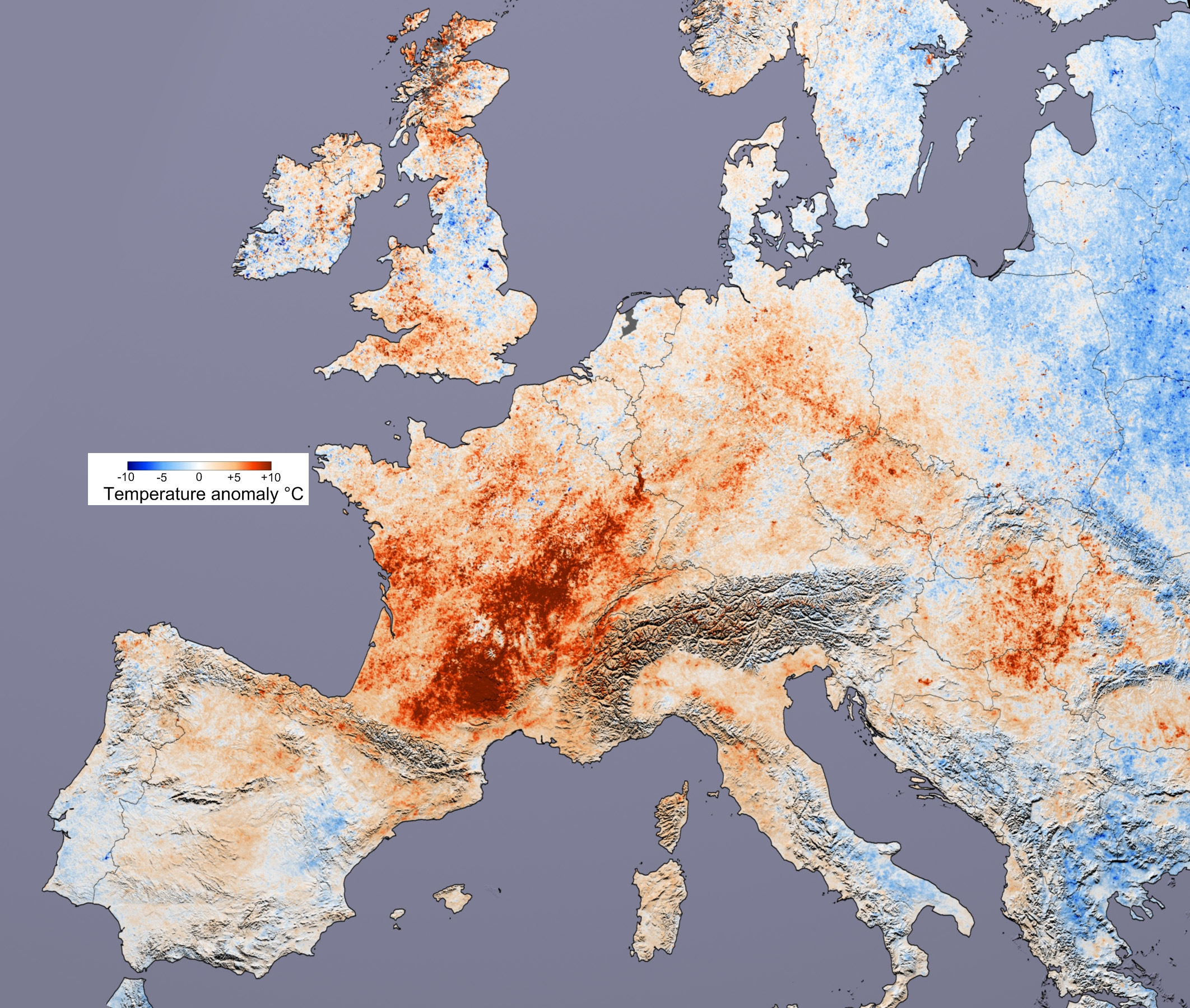
Map of temperature variations in Europe in summer 2003, compared to two years prior

In the summer of 2003, there was a severe heatwave across Europe, considered the warmest summer on the continent since 1540. The heat and drought killed 72,210 people across 15 countries, making it the sixth deadliest disaster worldwide in the first two decades of the 21st century. Most of the deaths occurred in Italy and France. Several nationwide temperature records were broken during the heatwave, with a peak temperature of 44.1 °C (111.4 °F) recorded in France on August 12.

There was also a heat wave across the United States from March through November that killed 35 people.

=== Tornadoes ===
Throughout the year, there were 1,374 tornadoes in the United States. In a one week period in May, a severe weather outbreak produced 335 tornadoes across 26 U.S. states, which set the record for the most twisters in a single week. There were 51 deaths related to the event.

=== Tropical cyclones ===
There was two tropical cyclones active as the year began – Cyclone Zoe in the southern Pacific Ocean, which quickly transitioned into an extratropical cyclone, and Tropical Storm Delfina, which moved across Mozambique and Malawi. There were seven named storms that developed within the South Pacific during the year. In the South-West Indian Ocean, there were 13 named storms, including a series of four simultaneous storms in February. The strongest cyclone in 2003 was Cyclone Inigo, which in April became one of the strongest cyclones ever recorded in the Australian basin. Inigo was one of nine named storms in the basin during the year, along with an unnamed storm.

In the northern hemisphere, the western Pacific featured 21 named storms, including Typhoon Maemi, which was the strongest storm on record to hit South Korea, resulting in 120 deaths and damage estimated at ₩5.52 trillion won (KRW, US$4.8 billion). In the northern Indian Ocean, there were five cyclonic storms, including one in May that produced flooding across Sri Lanka, killing 260 people. The Atlantic hurricane season lasted from April to November with 16 named storms. These included Fabian and Juan, the strongest hurricanes to hit Bermuda and Nova Scotia, respectively, in several decades. In the eastern Pacific, there were also 16 named storms, several of which affected Mexico.

=== Wildfires ===
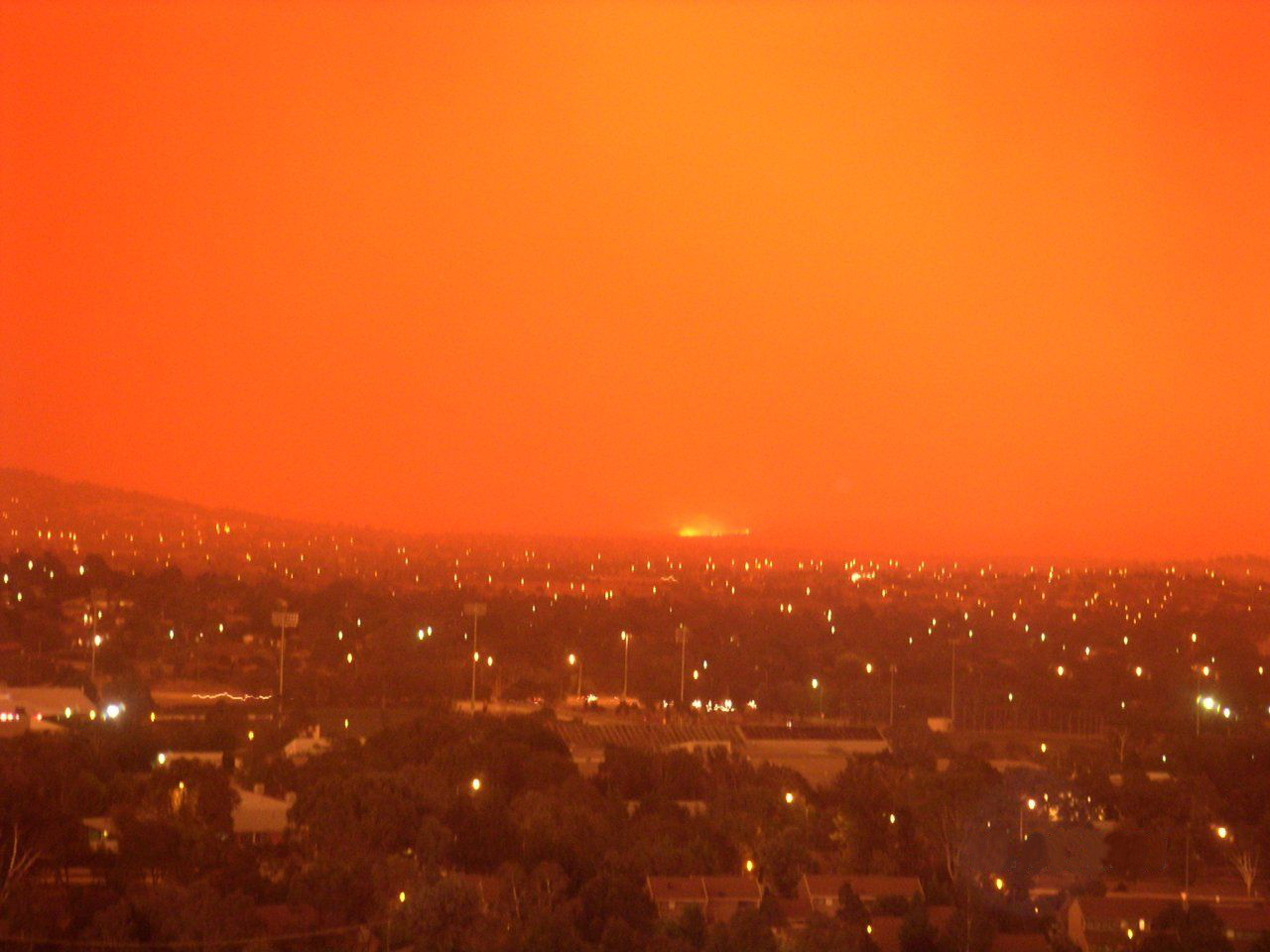
View from Canberra, Australia during bushfires

In January, high winds and lightning ignited bushfires in Canberra, Australia's capital city, which burned 70% of the territory's nature areas before being contained. The fires killed four people and caused 435 injuries. Throughout the northern hemisphere summer, wildfires burned 10% of Portugal's territory, killing 19 people.

== Timeline ==
This is a timeline of deadly weather events during 2003.

=== January ===
- December 2002 to February 2003 – A cold wave affected southern India, with more than 740 deaths related to cold temperatures in Bangladesh, India, and Nepal.
- January 8–21 – Bushfires in Canberra, Australia's capital city, killed four people and caused 435 injuries. The fires also burned 70% of the territory's nature areas.
- January 9–15 – Cyclone Ami moved through Fiji, killing 14 people.
- January 19–February 5 – Cyclone Beni trekked through the South Pacific for 18 days, eventually dissipating offshore the Australian state of Queensland. There was one death related to Beni.
- January 21 – Intense rainfall produced flooding in Bolivia's capital, La Paz, killing four people.
- January 24 – A rare ocean effect snowstorm took place in central Florida, alongside extremely cold wind chills.

=== February ===
- February 5–15 – Cyclone Gerry passed near Mauritius, killing one person.
- February 14–22 – A blizzard across eastern North America caused more than 20 deaths after it dropped 40 in (1,000 mm) of snow.
- February 25–March 6 – Cyclone Japhet struck Mozambique and crossed into Zimbabwe, killing 25 people.
- February 27–March 1 – Cyclone Graham moved ashore western Australia, resulting in one fatality.

=== March ===
- March 1–November 30 – A heat wave across the United States killed 35 people and resulted in US$5 billion in agriculture losses.
- March 1–17 – Cyclone Erica hit New Caledonia, killing two people.
- March 17–19 – A powerful blizzard struck Colorado, dumping heavy snow, causing building collapses, and shutting down an airport and highways.
- March 30–April 8 – Cyclone Inigo developed over Indonesia, causing at least 50 fatalities. It later became one of the most intense cyclones in the region, before weakening and striking Western Australia.

=== April ===
- April 4–7 – A severe weather outbreak killed three people across the southern United States.
- April 9–25 – Typhoon Kujira developed near the Federated States of Micronesia and later moved through southern Japan, killing three people.
- April 20 – Swells from Tropical Storm Ana capsized a boat in Florida, killing two people.
- April 28 – Flooding in Argentina's Santa Fe Province killed 23 people, described as the worst since records began 1573.

=== May ===
- May 2–13 – Cyclone Manou brushed southeastern Madagascar, resulting in 89 deaths.
- May 3–10 – A severe weather outbreak in the eastern half of the United States killed 51 people. With 335 tornadoes across 26 U.S. states, the outbreak set the record for the most twisters in a single week. Damage totaled US$4.1 billion.
- May 10–20 – A very severe cyclonic storm in the Bay of Bengal produced significant rainfall across Sri Lanka. Destructive floods killed 260 people and displaced about 800,000 people.
- May 25–June 2 – Tropical Storm Linfa developed west of the Philippines and later moved through Japan, causing 41 fatalities.

=== June ===
- June–August – A heatwave across Europe, considered the hottest since 1540, killed 72,210 people, particularly across France and Italy.
- June 11–24 – Typhoon Soudelor moved from the Philippine Sea and eventually passed between South Korea and Japan, causing 14 deaths along its path.
- June 26–27 – Tropical Storm Carlos struck southern Mexico, killing nine people.
- June 29–July 3 – Tropical Storm Bill moved ashore the U.S. state of Louisiana and produced a tornado outbreak across the southeastern United States. There were four deaths related to the storm.

=== July ===
- July 8–17 – Hurricane Claudette moved through the Caribbean Sea and Gulf of Mexico before striking the U.S. state of Texas, causing three deaths.
- Mid to late July – Heavy rainfall produced widespread flooding in Sudan, killing 12 people.
- July 15–23 – Tropical Storm Koni traversed the Philippines, southern China, and Vietnam, resulting in five fatalities.
- July 15–25 – Typhoon Imbudo made landfall in the northern Philippines and later the Chinese province of Guangdong, killing 85 people.
- July 21–23 – A derecho across the southern United States killed seven people and left over US$1 billion in damage, with the worst impacts in Memphis, Tennessee.
- July 31–August 4 – Tropical Storm Morakot hit Taiwan and southeastern China, resulting in three fatalities.

=== August ===
- August 2–9 – Typhoon Etau developed near the Federated States of Micronesia and later struck Japan, causing 20 deaths.
- August 13–26 – Typhoon Krovanh hit the northern Philippines and southern China, resulting in four fatalities.
- August 14–14 – Hurricane Erika hit northeastern Mexico, with two people killed by floodwaters.
- August 22–27 – Hurricane Ignacio struck Mexico's Baja California Peninsula, killing four people. Ignacio was the first hurricane of the annual season, the latest date for the season's first hurricane since reliable satellite observation began in 1966.
- August 24 – A squall with gale-force winds struck The Gambia, killing two people and damaging hundreds of buildings.
- August 27–September 3 – Typhoon Dujuan struck the Chinese province of Guangdong while also affecting the Philippines and Taiwan, resulting in 44 deaths.
- August 27–September 10 – Hurricane Fabian became the strongest hurricane to hit Bermuda since 1963, while also producing high waves along the eastern coastline of North America. Fabian caused eight deaths as well as US$300 million in damage, the most destructive storm on Bermuda since 1926.

=== September ===
- September 1–November 30 – Wildfires in the U.S. state of California killed 22 people, with damage estimated at US$3.9 billion.
- September 5–16 – Typhoon Maemi was the strongest typhoon to make landfall in South Korea since records began in 1904. Maemi also affected Japan, with 120 fatalities along its path.
- September 6–20 – Hurricane Isabel became a Category 5 on the Saffir-Simpson scale before weakening and striking the U.S. state of North Carolina, resulting in 51 deaths across the eastern United States.
- September 18–24 – Hurricane Marty hit Mexico's Baja California peninsula, killing 12 people.
- September 24–29 – Hurricane Juan made landfall in the Canadian province of Nova Scotia, becoming the strongest hurricane to hit Halifax since 1893. Juan killed eight people across Atlantic Canada.

=== October ===
- October 1–6 – Tropical Storm Larry hit the Mexican state of Tabasco, causing five deaths.
- October 6–10 – A depression in the Bay of Bengal moved ashore eastern India, killing 21 people.
- October 9 – A lightning strike on a school in Bikoro, Democratic Republic of the Congo, killed 11 people, with 85 injured.
- October 10–13 – A subtropical low moved through Japan, resulting in four deaths.
- October 14–November 14 – Floods in Vietnam, related to two heavy rainfall events, killed at least 103 people.
- October 21–24 – Tropical Depression Ursula killed one person while moving through the Philippines.
- October 29–November 5 – Severe Tropical Storm Melor, known locally as Viring, moved through the Philippines, causing four fatalities.

=== November ===
- November 2 – Flash floods in Indonesia killed at least 180 people in the tourist town of Bukit Lawang, after 450 buildings were swept away.
- November 11–19 – Typhoon Nepartak, known locally as Weng, crossed the central Philippines, killing 13 people.
- November 14– December – Floods in the Dominican Republic killed at least ten people.

=== December ===
- December – Monsoonal floods killed more than 200 people in the Philippines.
- December – Intense rainfall across Colombia produced flash floods and landslides that killed 42 deaths.
- December 4–9 – Tropical Storm Odette caused ten fatalities when it struck the Dominican Republic. Odette was the first recorded December Atlantic tropical storm in the Caribbean.
- December 11–16 – A cyclonic storm made landfall in the Indian state of Andhra Pradesh, resulting in 83 fatalities.
- December 20–22 – Floods in Haiti killed 38 people.
- December 28–30 – A winter storm in Utah killed at least two people from traffic accidents.

== Notes ==
Global weather by year
Preceded by 2002	Weather of 2003	Succeeded by 2004
