= Kalingapatnam Beach =

Beach in Andhra Pradesh, India

- Beach
- Coordinates: 18.3405°N 84.1218°E
- Location: Kalingapatnam, Srikakulam district, Andhra Pradesh, India

Kalingapatnam Beach is located on the coast of Kalingapatnam, where Vamsadhara River empties into Bay of Bengal. It is located at a distance of 30 km from Srikakulam in Srikakulam district of the Indian state of Andhra Pradesh. Kalingapatnam Beach has been recognized by the State Government, with the state tourism board APTDC promoting it as a tourist destination. As it was an ancient harbor, it is equipped with a lighthouse where exporting of goods such as perfumes and textiles took place, before being closed during British rule. The beach is also known as Open Road Sea, due to the road ending in the sea shore bed.

== See also ==
- List of beaches in India
