= 2003 North Indian Ocean cyclone season =

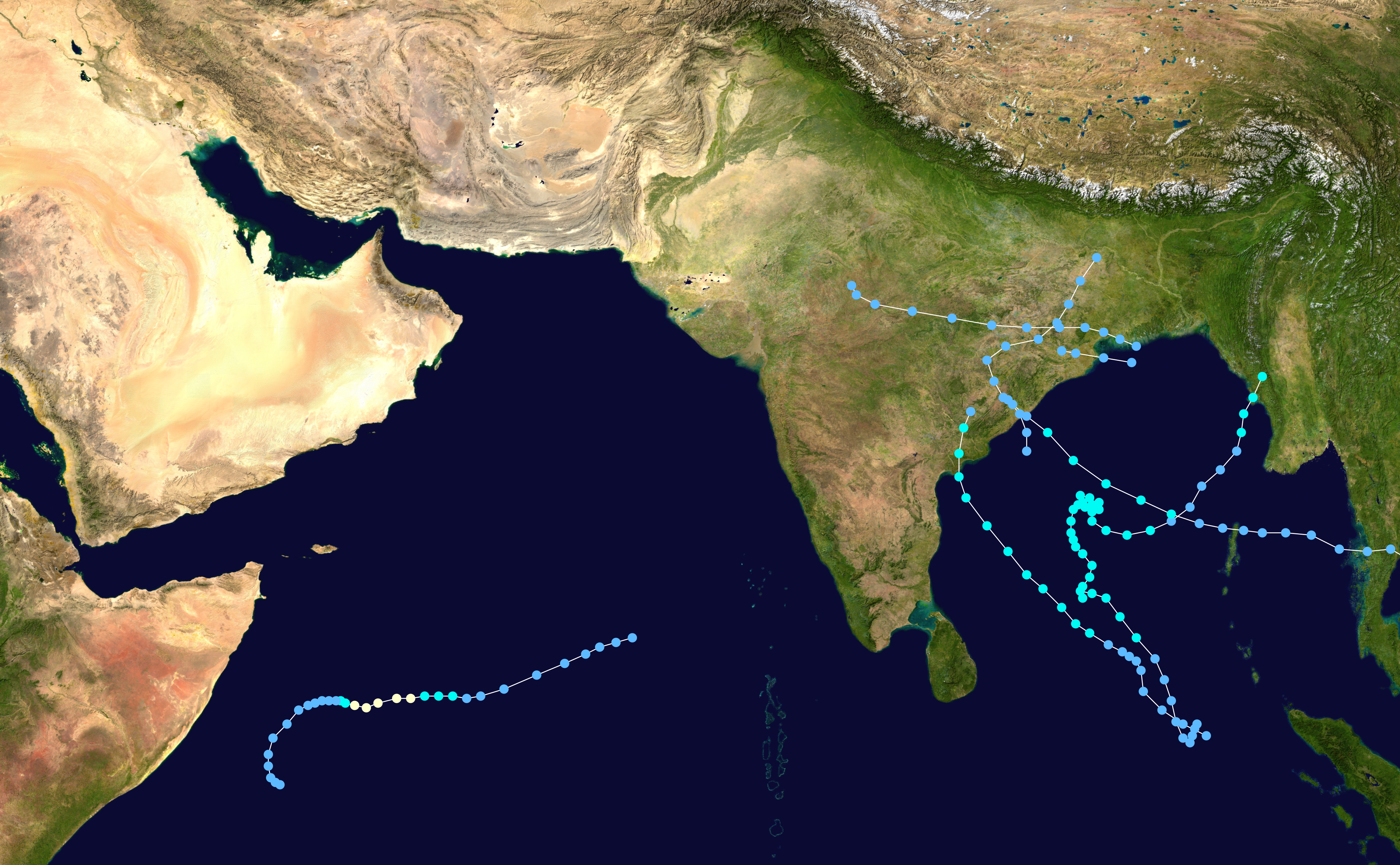
- Season summary map

Seasonal boundaries
- First system formed: May 10, 2003
- Last system dissipated: December 16, 2003

Strongest storm
- Name: BOB 01
  - Maximum winds: 140 km/h (85 mph) (3-minute sustained)
  - Lowest pressure: 980 hPa (mbar)

Seasonal statistics
- Depressions: 7
- Deep depressions: 5
- Cyclonic storms: 3
- Severe cyclonic storms: 3
- Very severe cyclonic storms: 1
- Total fatalities: 358 total
- Total damage: $163 million (2003 USD)

Related articles
- 2003 Atlantic hurricane season; 2003 Pacific hurricane season; 2003 Pacific typhoon season

The 2003 North Indian Ocean cyclone season was the last season that tropical cyclones were not publicly labeled by India Meteorological Department (IMD). It was the third consecutive below average season. Also was mostly focused in the Bay of Bengal, where six of the seven depressions developed. The remaining system was a tropical cyclone that developed in the Arabian Sea in November, which was also the only system that did not affect land. There were three cyclonic storms, which was below the average of 4–6. Only one storm formed before the start of the monsoon season in June, although it was also the most notable. On May 10, a depression formed in the central Bay of Bengal, and within a few days became a very severe cyclonic storm. After it stalled, it drew moisture from the southwest to produce severe flooding across Sri Lanka, killing 254 people and becoming the worst floods there since 1947. Damage on the island totaled $135 million (2003 USD). The storm eventually made landfall in Myanmar on May 19. It is possible that the storm contributed to a deadly heat wave in India due to shifting air currents.

In late July, a monsoon depression moved across much of India, and another monsoon disturbance persisted off the coast of Pakistan. The interaction between the two systems resulted in heavy rainfall across the region, flooding dozens of villages. Monsoonal rainfall killed 285 people between Pakistan and India in the summer of 2003. In late August, another monsoon depression moved across northeastern India. A depression that struck Andhra Pradesh in India killed 21 people in early October. Later that month, a tropical depression crossed Thailand from the western Pacific Ocean, contributing to ongoing flooding that killed 19. Once in the Indian Ocean, this system struck southeastern India without causing much damage. The last system of the year was a cyclonic storm that struck southeastern India in December, killing 81 people and causing $28 million in damage (2003 USD).

== Season summary ==
There were seven depressions throughout the season, of which three attained cyclonic storm status. One of the cyclonic storms formed before the start of the monsoon season, two depressions formed during the monsoon season from June to September, and the remaining systems formed after September. The number of depressions was similar or greater than that of the previous three years. However, the total of 3 cyclonic storms was below the average of 5.4.

In May 2004, seven of the eight members of the World Meteorological Organization panel on tropical cyclones for the North Indian Ocean met in Colombo, Sri Lanka to review the season. During the meeting, the panel announced the first list of tropical cyclone names to be used in the basin for the following season. The panel noted the increasing frequency of deadly natural disasters in the region, such as the floods that affected Sri Lanka in May 2003 from a cyclone. One of the panel's goals was increased coordination between the countries in the region. The India Meteorological Department (IMD) in New Delhi served as the official Regional Specialized Meteorological Center, although the Joint Typhoon Warning Center also issued warnings for the region in an unofficial capacity. The IMD utilized satellite data from EUMETSAT to track cyclones, as well as radars from Bangladesh, Sri Lanka, and India.

There were several other monsoon disturbances that affected various countries in the region, including Bangladesh, Pakistan, and Oman. On July 27, during the monsoon season, an area of convection exited from the coast of Pakistan. On the next day, the thunderstorms organized around the center, prompting the Pakistan Meteorological Department to classify the system as a monsoon depression. The IMD operationally classified the system as a depression on July 29, although it was dropped during the agency's annual report. The system weakened into a remnant low on July 30. The system drew moisture from another depression that had moved across India from the Bay of Bengal, bringing three days of heavy rainfall to Karachi, Pakistan. Badin in southeastern Pakistan recorded 292 mm (11.5 in) of rainfall in 24 hours. The rainfall extended into northwestern India, and in Gujarat, a station received more than its annual rainfall during the deluge. Flooding from the heavy rainfall destroyed widespread crops and flooded dozens of villages, and ongoing rains persisted throughout the summer, killing 285 people in the two countries.

== Systems ==
=== Very Severe Cyclonic Storm BOB 01 (01B) ===
- Very severe cyclonic storm (IMD)
- Tropical storm (SSHWS)
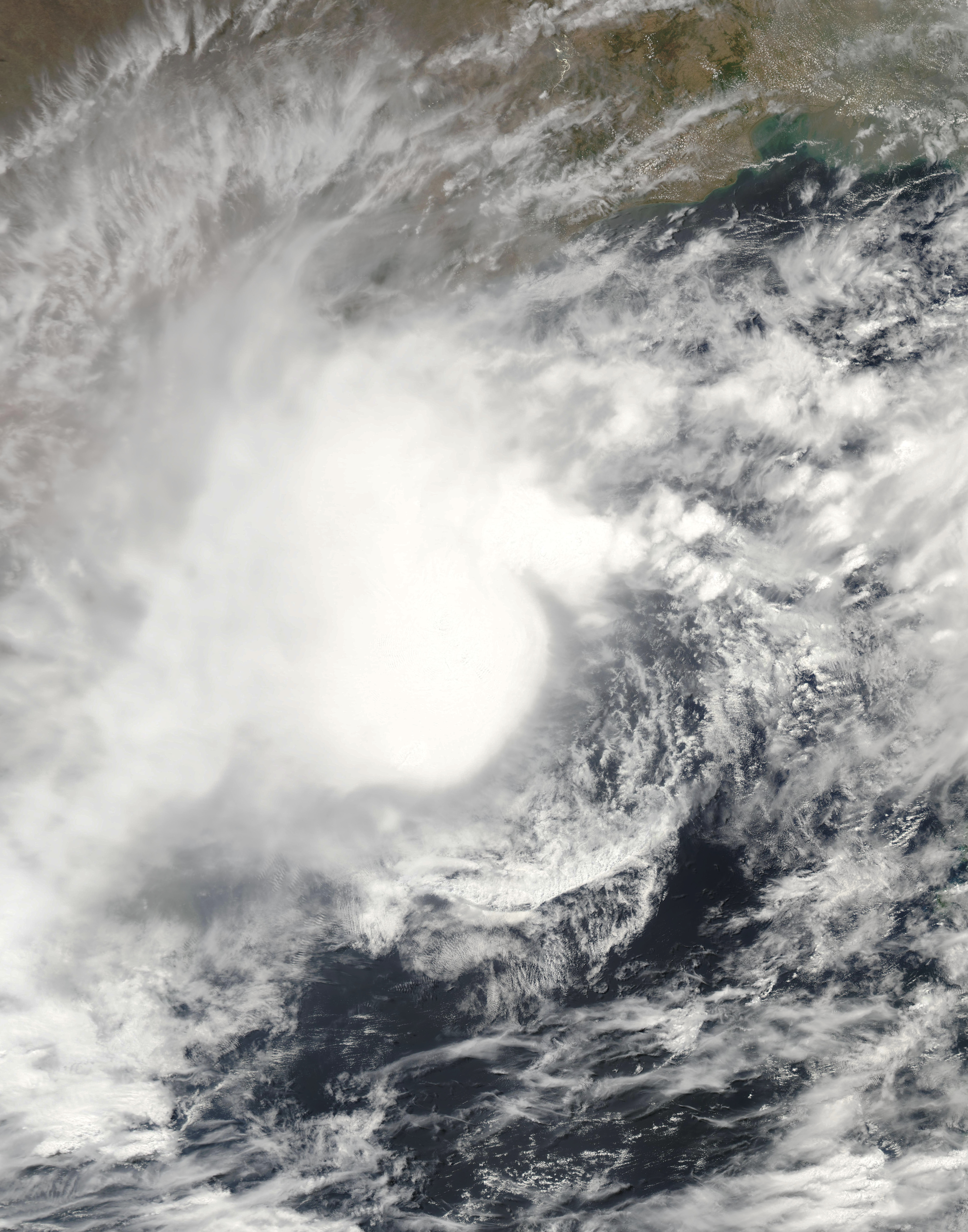
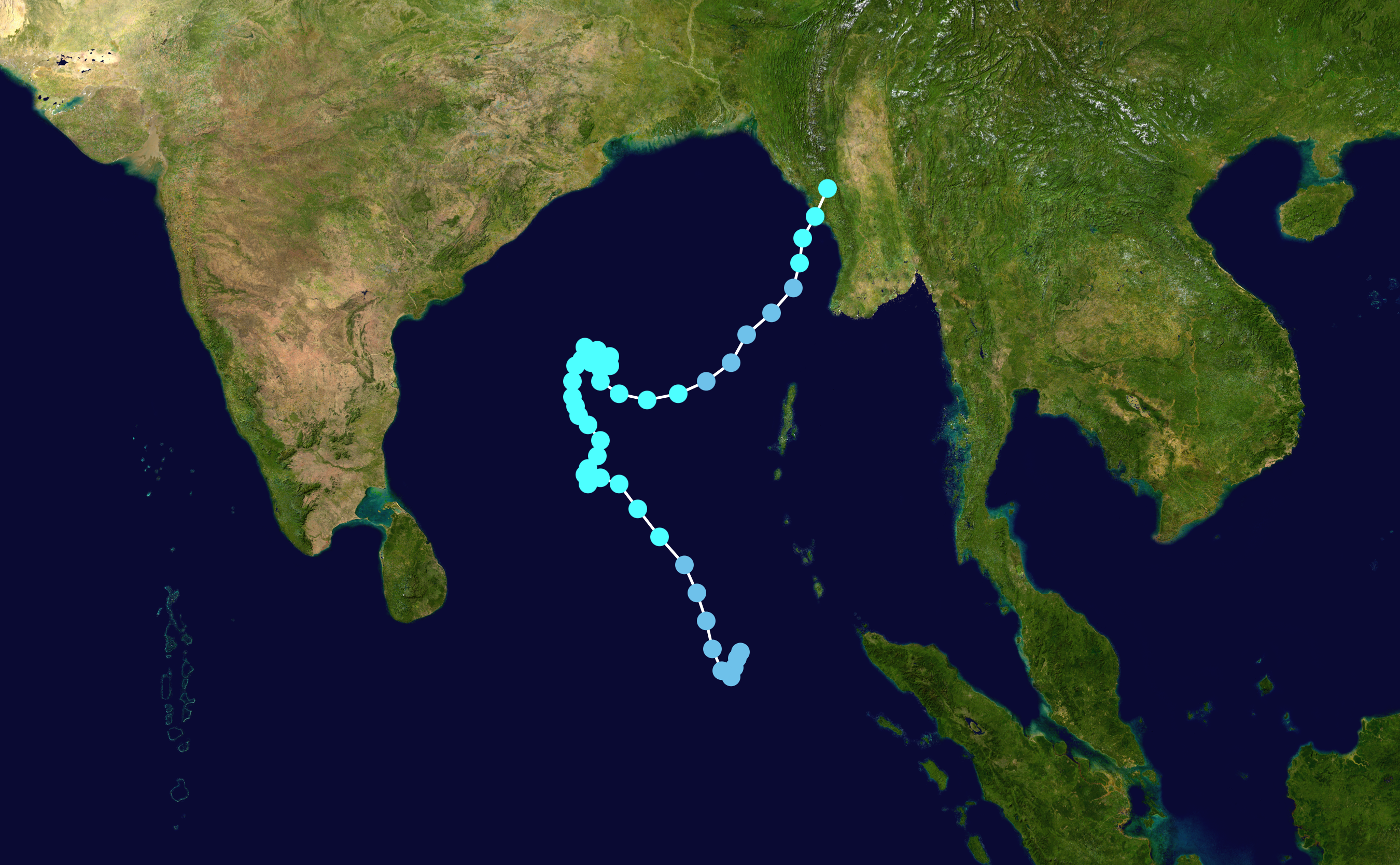
- Duration: May 10 – May 20
- Peak intensity: 140 km/h (85 mph) (3-min); 980 hPa (mbar)

The first storm of the season originated from the monsoon trough, developing into a depression on May 10 in the Bay of Bengal. Initially favorable conditions allowed the system to steadily intensify while moving northwestward, reaching peak maximum sustained winds of 140 km/h (85 mph) on May 13. This made it a very severe cyclonic storm according to the IMD. The storm later drifted northward and later to the east in the central Bay of Bengal, although increased wind shear induced weakening into a deep depression. The system eventually began a steady northeast track, bringing it ashore in western Myanmar on May 19 as a re-intensified cyclonic storm. It dissipated shortly thereafter over land, and was no longer observable on satellite imagery by May 20.

Early and later in its duration, the storm brought rainfall to the Andaman and Nicobar Islands. Although the storm never passed within 700 km (430 mi) of the island, the cyclone produced torrential rainfall across southwest Sri Lanka after it stalled in the central Bay of Bengal. The storm drew moisture from the southwest that coalesced in the mountainous portion of the island. A station at Ratnapura recorded 366.1 mm (14.41 in) of rainfall in 18 hours on May 17, including 99.8 mm (3.93 in) in one hour. This followed a period of regular rainfall in the first 15 days of May across the region. The rains caused flooding and landslides in southwestern Sri Lanka that destroyed 24,750 homes and damaged 32,426 others, leaving about 800,000 people homeless. Overall damage totaled about $29 million (2003 USD), mostly to roads and buildings, and there were 254 deaths. This made it the worst floods on the island since 1947. The storm also drew moisture away from India, which possibly contributed to a heat wave that killed 1,200 people, and dropped heavy rainfall in Myanmar.

=== Deep Depression BOB 02 ===
- Deep depression (IMD)
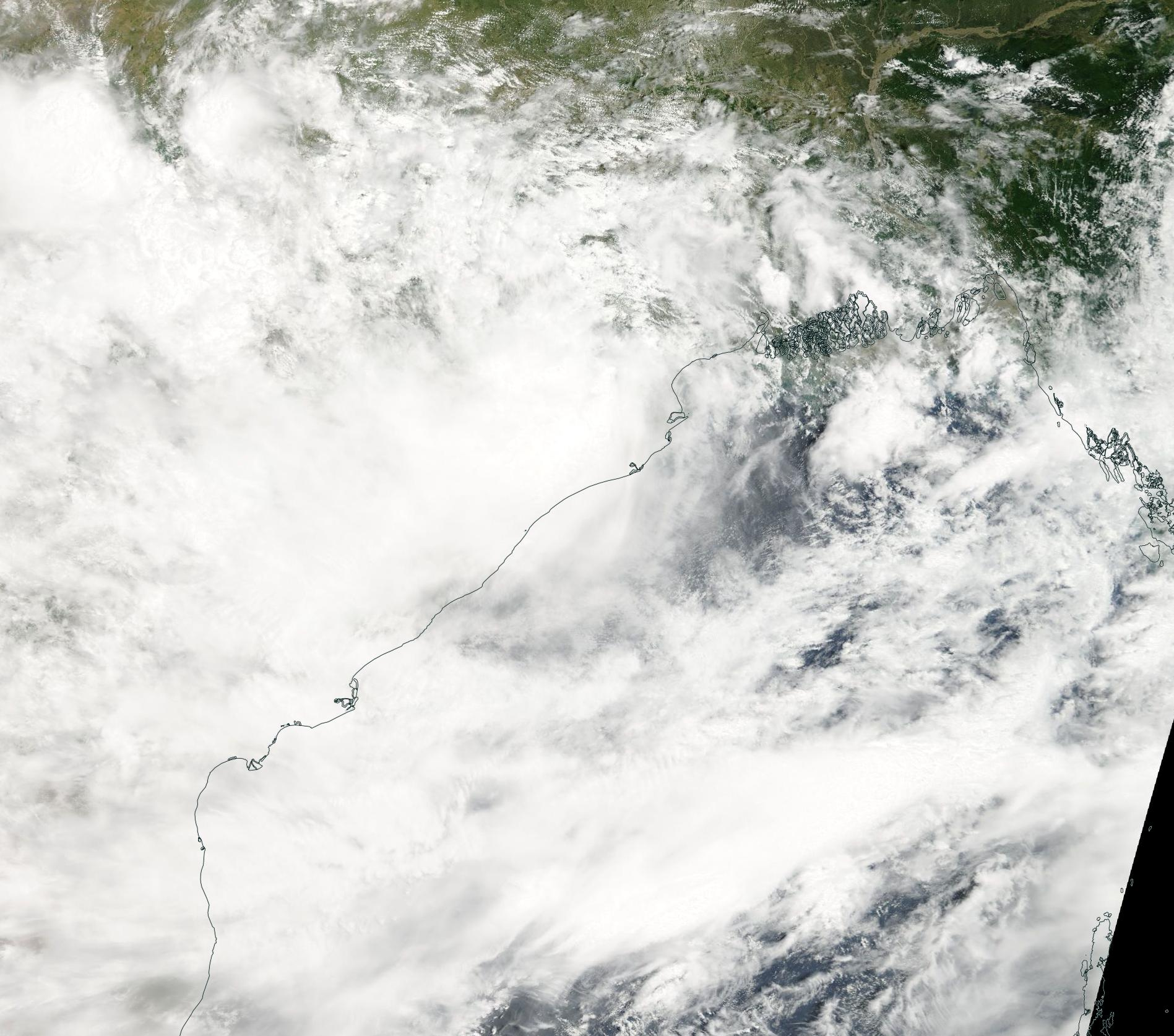
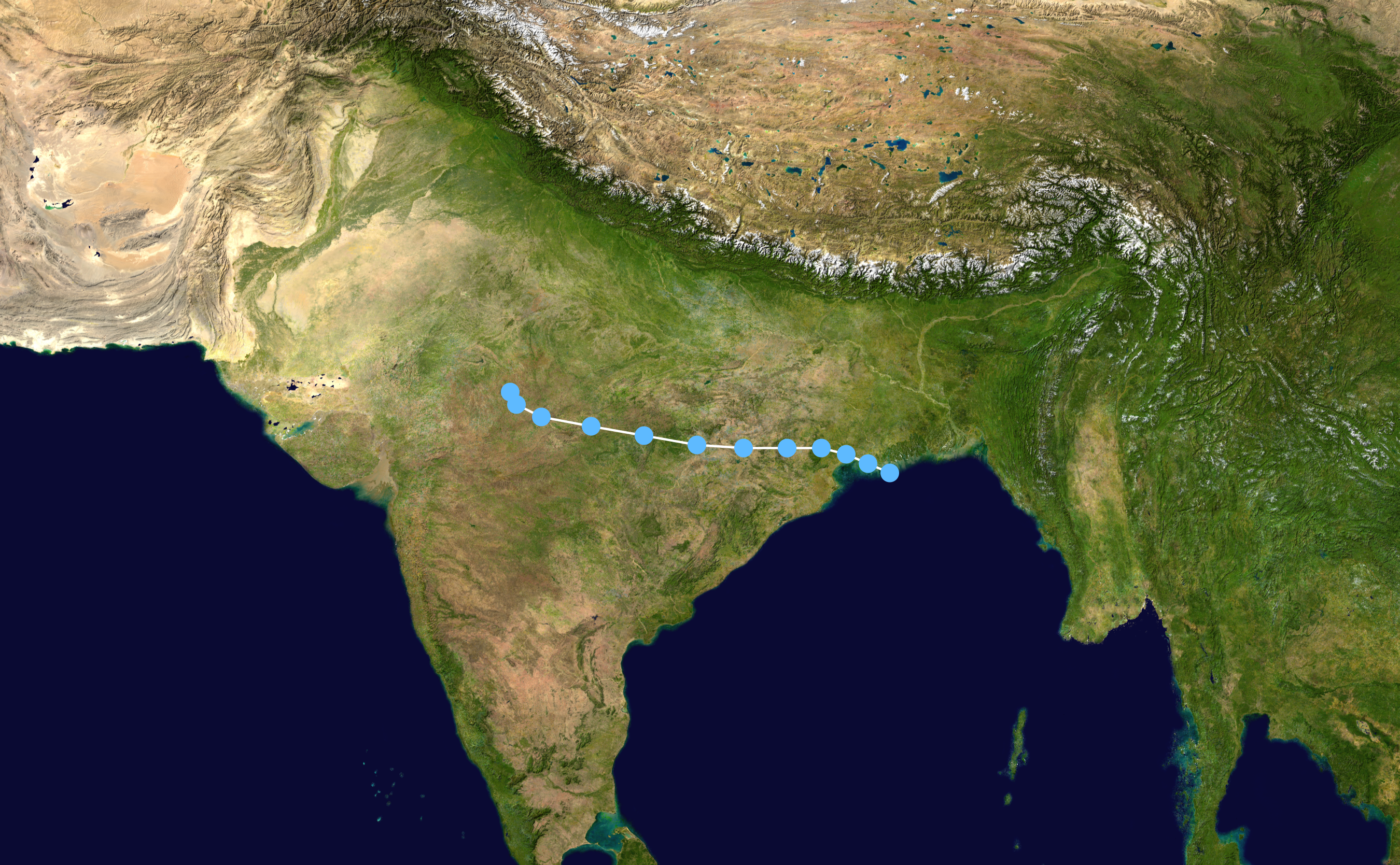
- Duration: July 25 – July 28
- Peak intensity: 55 km/h (35 mph) (3-min); 988 hPa (mbar)

A low pressure area persisted over the northern Bay of Bengal on July 22, eventually organizing into a depression on July 25 about 160 km (99 mi) south of Kolkata. Moving northwestward, the system quickly intensified into a deep depression, with peak winds estimated at 55 km/h (35 mph). Late on July 25, the system made landfall north of Balasore in Odisha state. It progressed inland across India, weakening to depression status but remaining a distinct system. On July 28, the depression degenerated into a remnant low over Rajasthan in northwestern India, later merging with a heat low. Rainfall associated with the system mostly occurred in the southwestern periphery, with a peak of 250 mm (9.8 in) at Kendrapara; there was little damage. Rainfall also spread into Bangladesh.

=== Depression BOB 03 ===
- Depression (IMD)
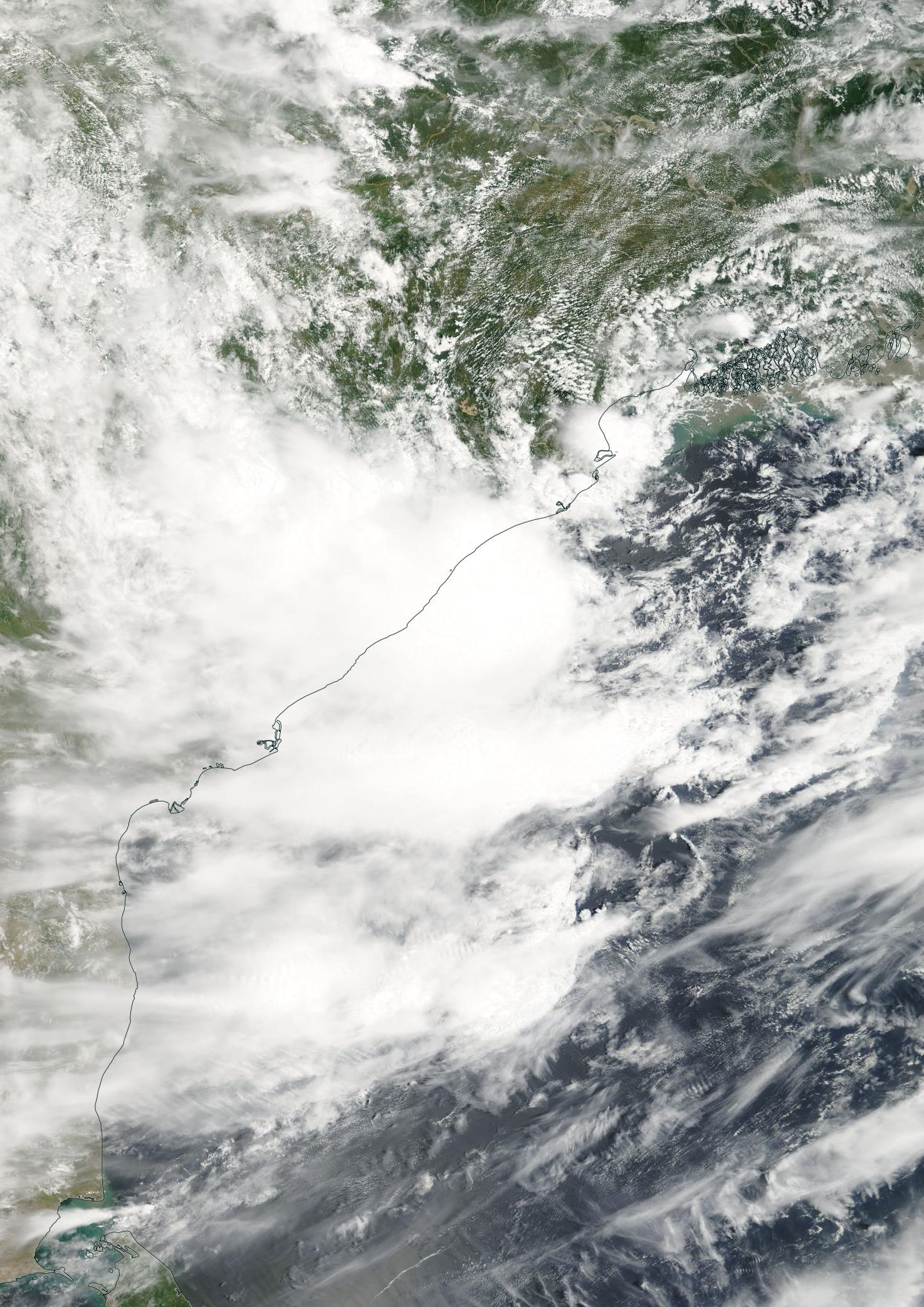
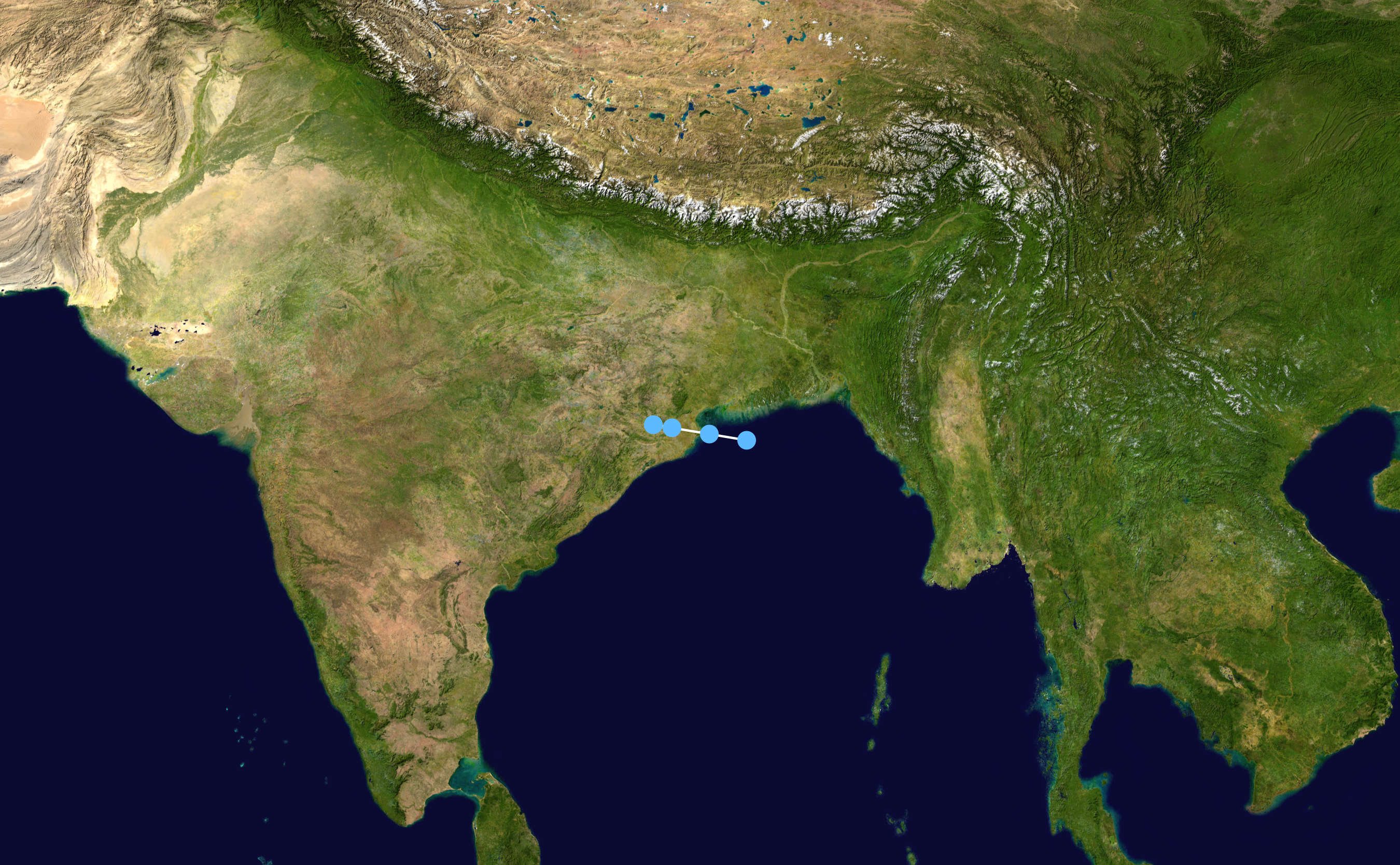
- Duration: August 27 – August 29
- Peak intensity: 45 km/h (30 mph) (3-min); 996 hPa (mbar)

On August 27, a low-pressure area organized into a depression about 230 km (140 mi) south of Kolkata. The system largely consisted of a circulation without much organized convection. It moved to the west-northwest and failed to intensify, moving ashore near Chandabali, Odisha on August 28. Once over land, the depression stalled, before dissipating on August 29. Rainfall from the storm peaked at 200 mm (7.9 in) at Kantamal in Odisha, and there were no reports of damage. The system was largely connected with the monsoon, resulting in an increase in rainfall over northeastern India.

=== Depression BOB 04 ===
- Depression (IMD)
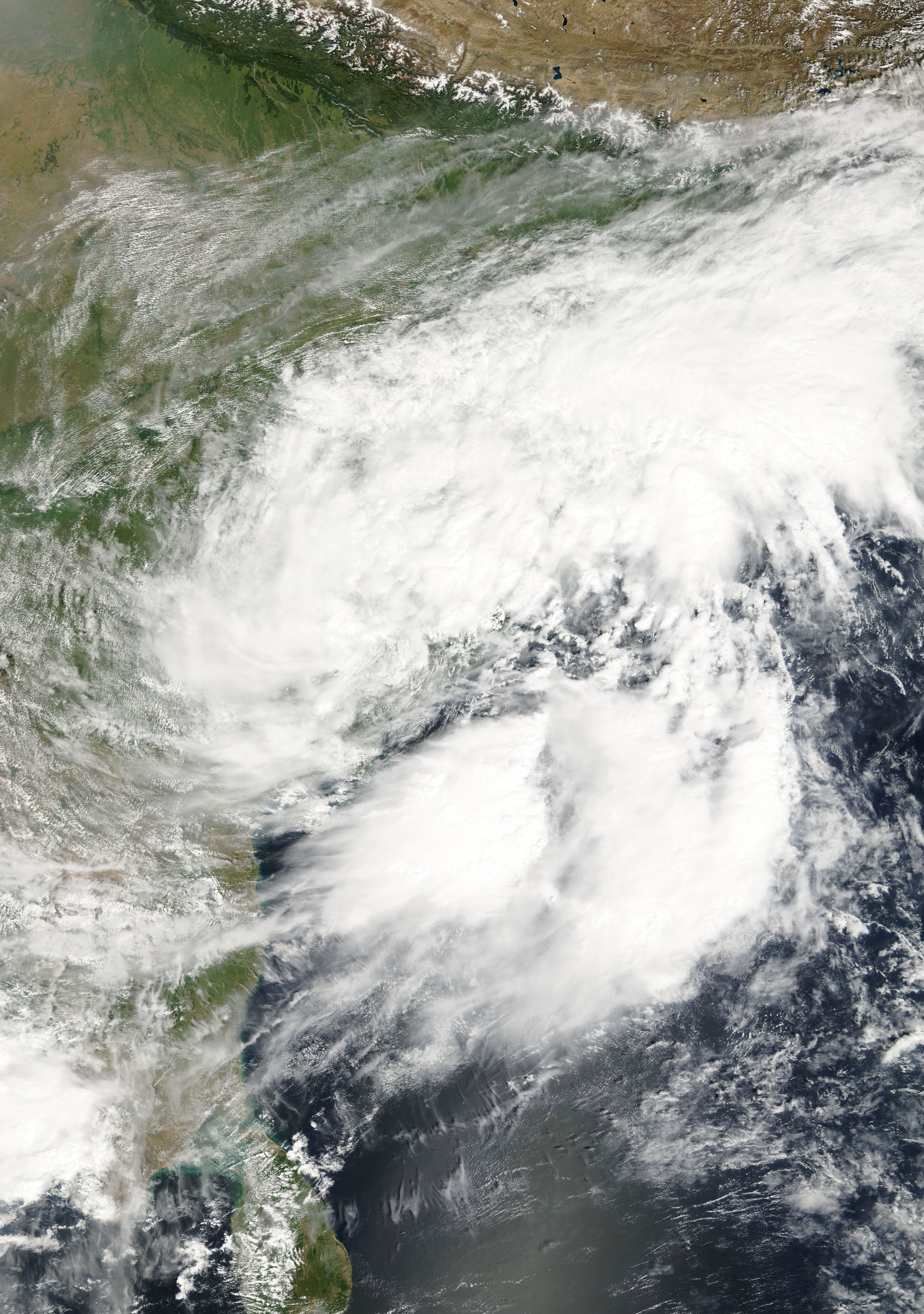
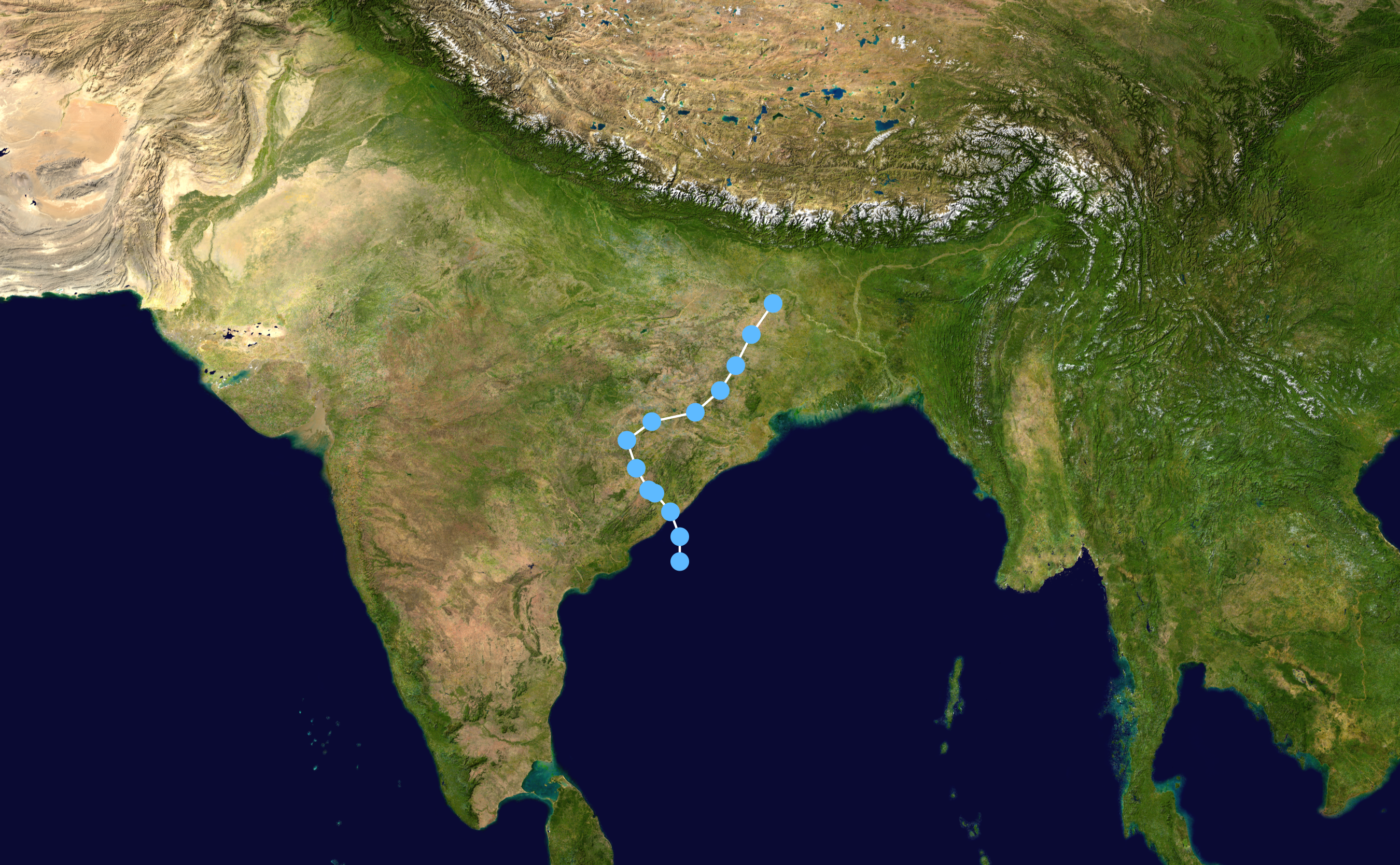
- Duration: October 6 – October 10
- Peak intensity: 45 km/h (30 mph) (3-min); 998 hPa (mbar)

A low-pressure area persisted on October 4 in the western Bay of Bengal, off the east coast of Tamil Nadu. Two days later, the system organized into a depression and moved northward. Early on October 7, the depression made landfall at Kalingapatnam, Andhra Pradesh. After moving slowly northwestward over land, the system turned to the northeast, degenerating into a remnant low on October 10 over West Bengal. The depression dropped heavy rainfall along its path, peaking at 380 mm (15 in) in Chandabali, Odisha. Kolkata received 267 mm (10.5 in), and rainfall spread as far northeast as Assam. The rains caused widespread flooding across southeastern India, inundating 20 villages and covering 16,000 hectares (39,000 acres) of rice paddies. A tornado spawned by the depression injured 11 people and damaged several houses in Murshidabad. Across its track, the depression killed 13 people in West Bengal and another eight in Andhra Pradesh.

=== Deep Depression BOB 05 (23W) ===
- Deep depression (IMD)
- Tropical storm (SSHWS)
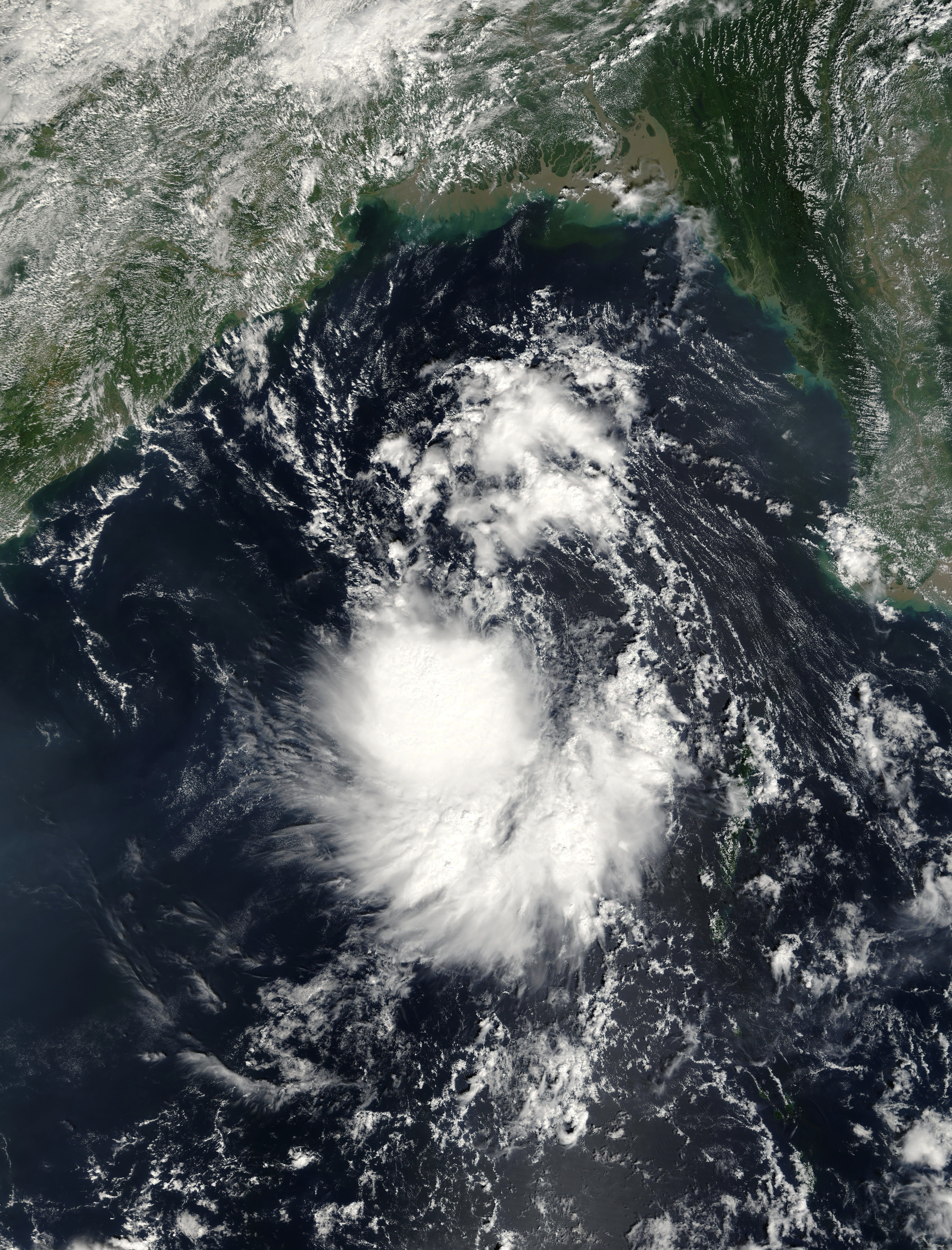
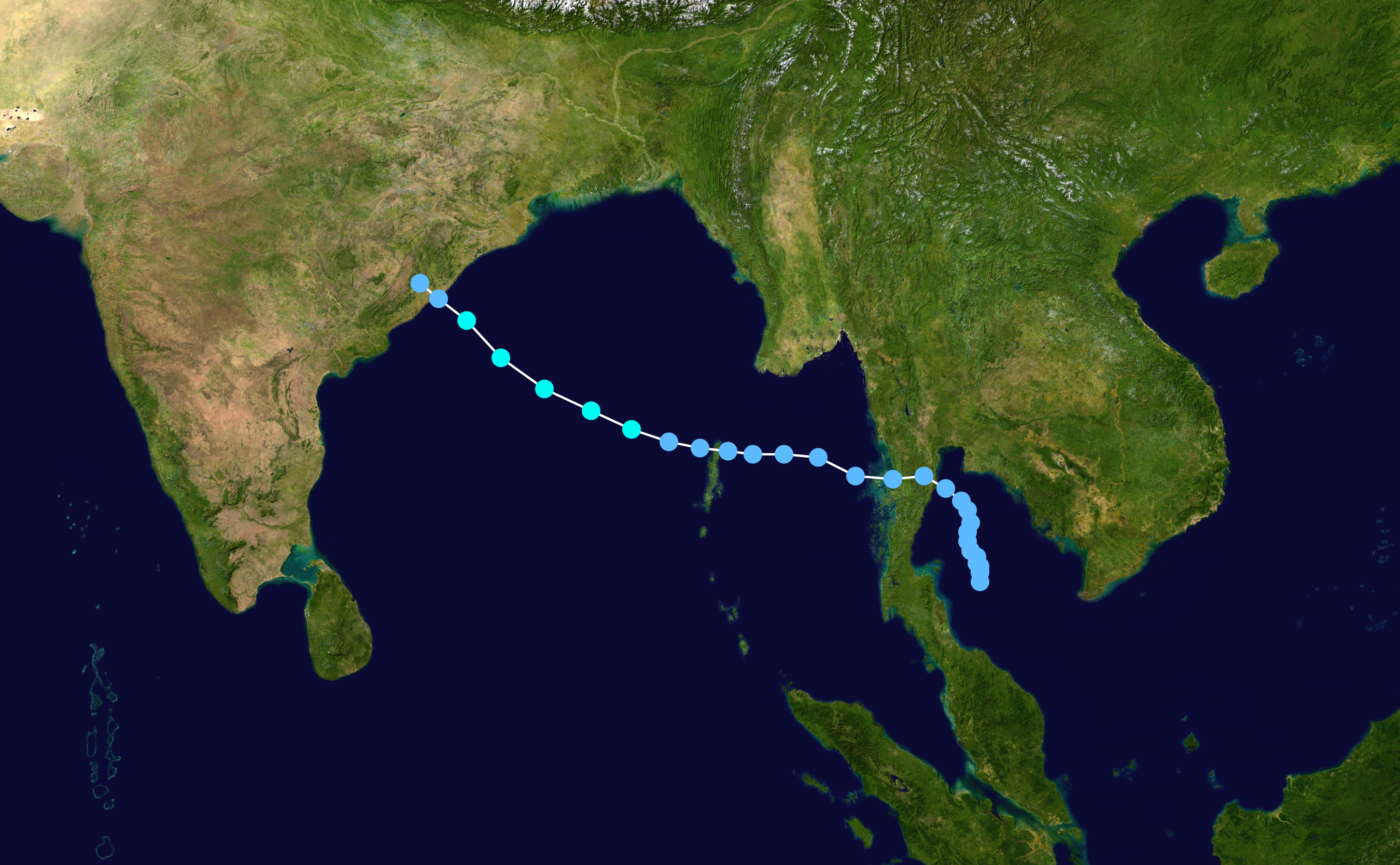
- Duration: October 24 (entered basin) – October 29
- Peak intensity: 55 km/h (35 mph) (3-min); 997 hPa (mbar)

On October 21, an area of convection formed in the Gulf of Thailand in the western Pacific Ocean. With low wind shear, the thunderstorms organized around the circulation, prompting the JTWC to initiate advisories on Tropical Depression 23W. While drifting northward, the system failed to organize further. Later, a ridge steered the depression to the west, bringing it ashore Thailand on October 24 near Hua Hin District. The next day, the circulation entered the Bay of Bengal after weakening over land, passing near the Andaman and Nicobar Islands. On October 26, the IMD began classifying the system as a depression. The convection gradually reorganized as the system turned to the northwest, prompting the JTWC to upgrade it to a minimal tropical storm on October 27. On the same day, the IMD upgraded it to deep depression status. The system made landfall between Visakhapatnam and Kalingapatnam in Andhra Pradesh on October 28, and dissipated the next day.

While crossing Thailand, the depression produced heavy rainfall reaching 127.7 mm (5.03 in) at Hua Hin over a 24‑hour period. Ongoing monsoonal flooding in the country forced thousands of people to evacuate their houses. About 22,000 cattle were killed, and large areas of farmlands were inundated. Officials opened the Kaeng Krajan Dam to prevent it from being destroyed by the floods. Damage from the depression alone was estimated at ฿1 billion baht ($25 million 2003 USD). The monsoonal rains in October and November 2003 in the country killed 19 people. In India, the depression dropped locally heavy rainfall, reaching 120 mm (4.7 in) in Dummugudem. There was little damage in the country.

=== Severe Cyclonic Storm ARB 06 (02A) ===
- Severe cyclonic storm (IMD)
- Category 1 tropical cyclone (SSHWS)
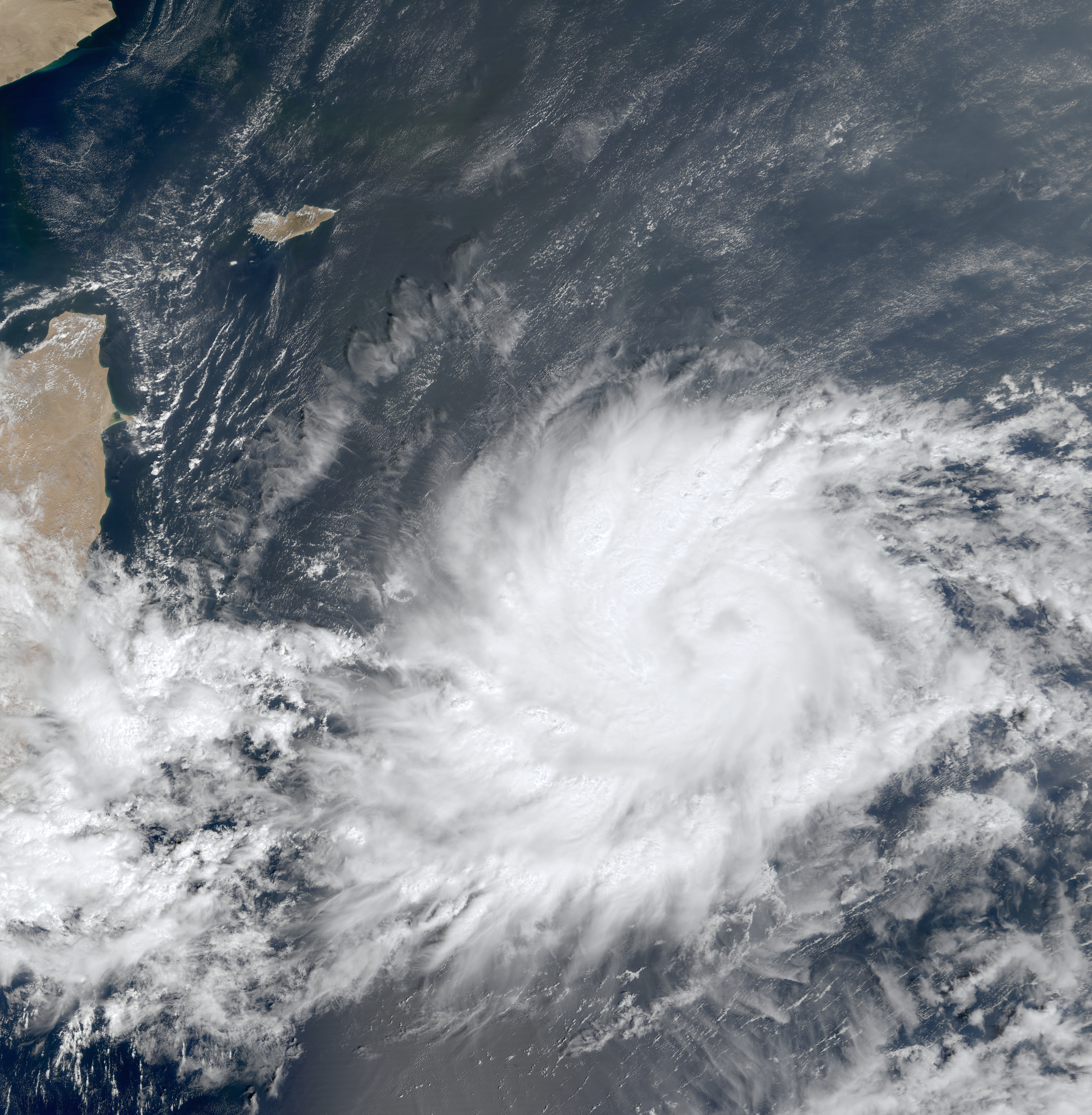
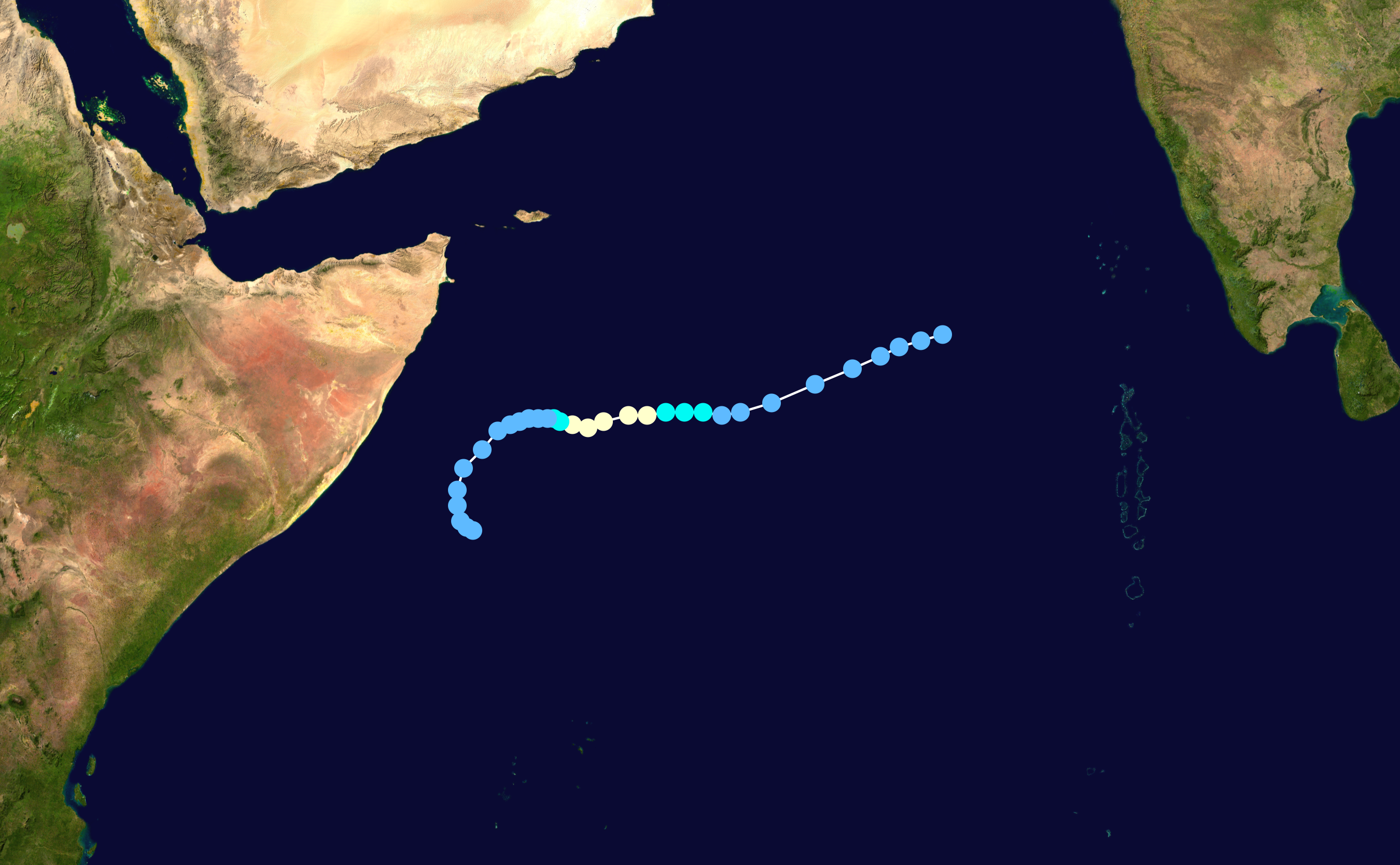
- Duration: November 12 – November 16
- Peak intensity: 100 km/h (65 mph) (3-min); 990 hPa (mbar)

The lone system in the Arabian Sea in the season originated from a trough. On November 10, an area of convection formed off the western coast of India. With little wind shear, the system organized further as it moved west-southwestward due to a ridge to the north. On November 12, the system developed into a depression and quickly intensified into a deep depression. That day, the JTWC classified the system as Tropical Cyclone 02A, and it intensified into a cyclonic storm on November 13. The storm was located at an unusually low latitude of 6° N. After an eye developed in the center of the convection, the JTWC upgraded the storm to the equivalent of a minimal hurricane, estimating peak winds of 150 km/h (95 mph) on November 14. By contrast, the IMD estimated peak winds of 100 km/h (60 mph), making the system a severe cyclonic storm. Subsequently, drier air weakened the storm, causing the convection to decrease. By November 15, the storm had weakened to depression status while approaching Somalia. That day, the JTWC discontinued advisories while the storm was about 520 km (320 mi) east of the Somalia coastline. On November 16, the depression degenerated into a remnant low, and subsequently dissipated.

=== Severe Cyclonic Storm BOB 07 (03B) ===
- Severe cyclonic storm (IMD)
- Tropical storm (SSHWS)
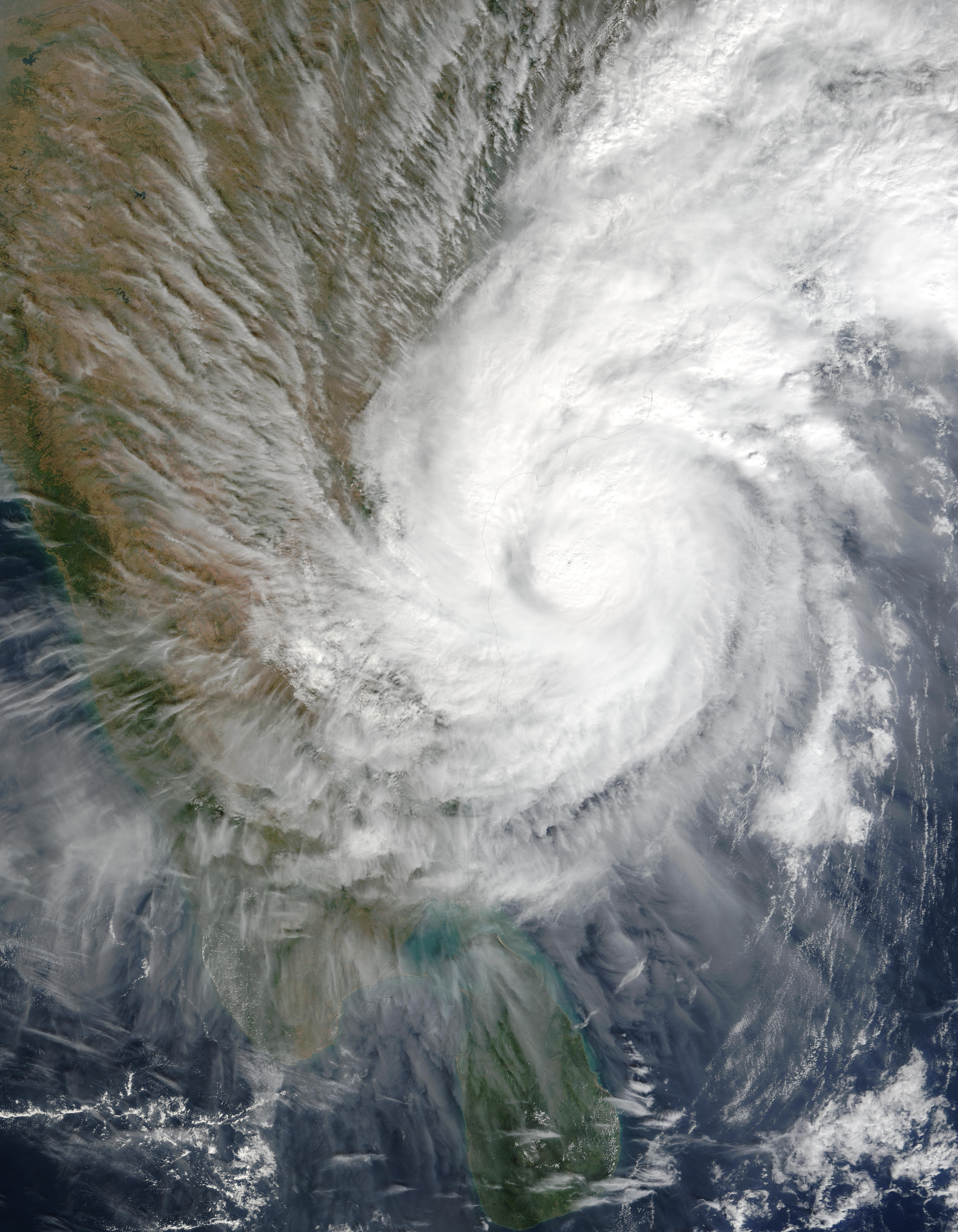
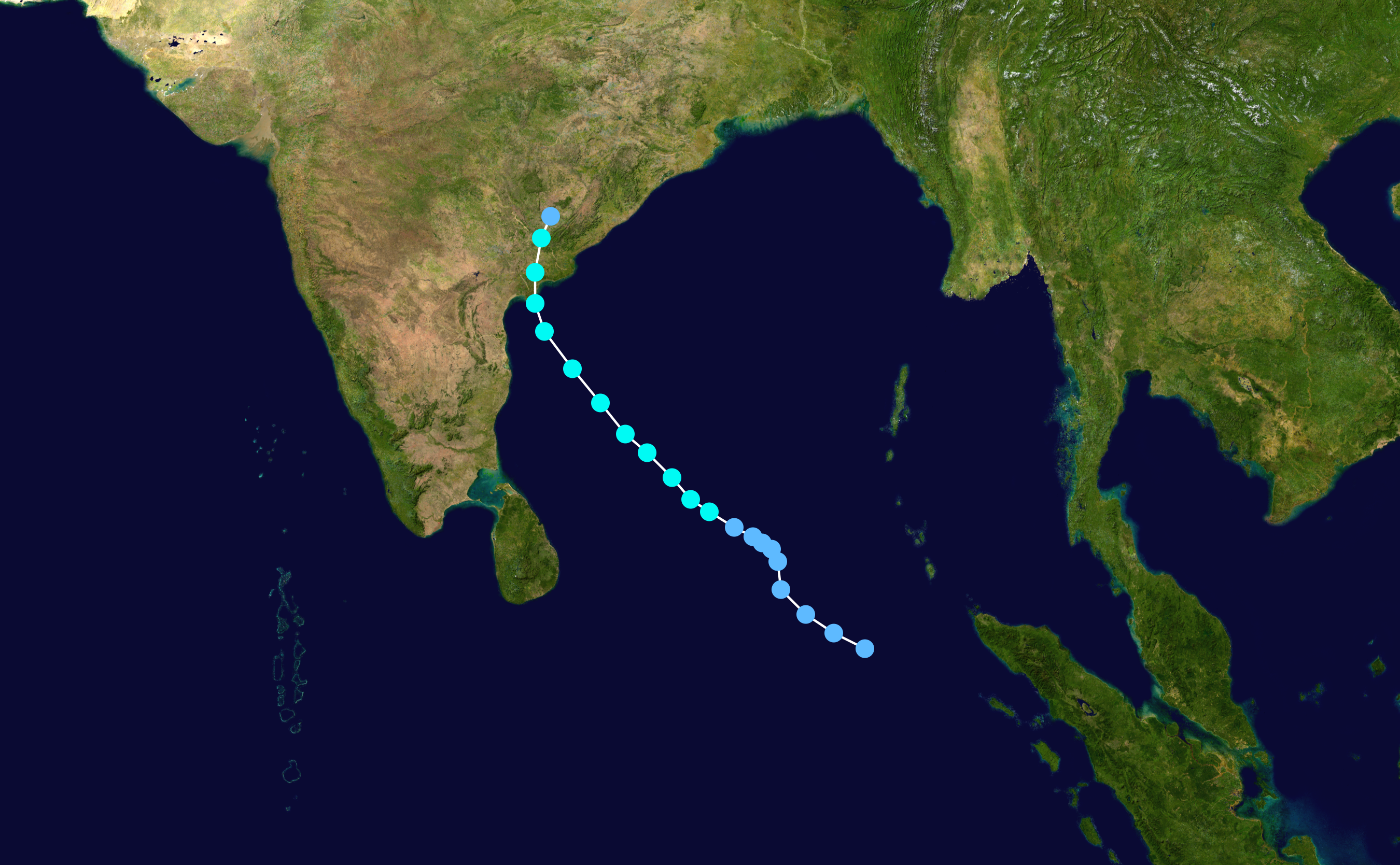
- Duration: December 11 – December 16
- Peak intensity: 100 km/h (65 mph) (3-min); 992 hPa (mbar)

On December 10, an area of convection with an associated circulation persisted about 740 km (460 mi) west of the northern tip of Sumatra, as part of a trough in the region and enhanced by the monsoon. A steady decline in the wind shear allowed the thunderstorms to organize, and a depression formed on December 11. On the next day, the JTWC initiated advisories on Tropical Cyclone 03B. The storm moved generally northwestward, steered by a ridge to the north. The IMD upgraded the system to a deep depression and later cyclonic storm on December 13, and further to a severe cyclonic storm a day later. The agency estimated peak winds of 100 km/h (60 mph), noting spiral convection organizing around the beginnings of an eye feature. The storm also developed well-defined outflow due to an approaching trough from the west. At around 14:30 UTC on December 15, the storm made landfall near False Divi Point in southeastern India, along the coast of Andhra Pradesh. After turning to the northeast over land, the system rapidly weakened, degenerating into a remnant low on December 16.

Before the storm made landfall, officials evacuated about 20,000 people. As the storm moved ashore in India, it produced heavy rainfall that reached 190 mm (7.5 in) at Repalle, Andhra Pradesh. Light rains fell in neighboring Tamil Nadu. The rains deluged 61,898.5 ha (152,955 acres) of fields in Andhra Pradesh. The storm damaged or destroyed 9,090 houses, and downed several trees and power lines. Local news reports indicated that the storm produced 10 m (33 ft) waves as it moved ashore, which damaged a ship and forced its crew to be rescued by the Indian Coast Guard. In Andhra Pradesh, the storm killed 83 people and resulted in $28 million (2003 USD) in damage. After the storm, the government provided ₹50,000 rupees (US$1,111) to the family of every storm victim.

== Season effects ==
Name	Dates	Peak intensity			Areas affected	Damage (USD)	Deaths	Ref(s).
Name	Dates	Category	Wind speed	Pressure	Areas affected	Damage (USD)	Deaths	Ref(s).
BOB 01	May 10 – 20	Very Severe Cyclonic storm	140 km/h (85 mph)	980 hPa (28.94 inHg)	Sri Lanka, India, Myanmar, Bangladesh	$135 million	260	
BOB 02	July 25 –28	Deep depression	55 km/h (35 mph)	988 hPa (29.18 inHg)	East India, Bangladesh			
BOB 03	August 27 – 29	Depression	45 km/h (30 mph)	996 hPa (29.41 inHg)	Northeastern India			
BOB 04	October 6 – 10	Depression	45 km/h (30 mph)	998 hPa (29.47 inHg)	India	None	21	
BOB 05	October 24 – 29	Deep depression	55 km/h (35 mph)	997 hPa (29.44 inHg)	Thailand, Malaysia, Myanmar, India			
ARB 06	November 12 – 16	Severe Cyclonic storm	100 km/h (60 mph)	990 hPa (29.23 inHg)	Maldives, Somalia	None	None	
BOB 07	December 11 – 16	Severe Cyclonic storm	100 km/h (60 mph)	990 hPa (29.23 inHg)	India, Indonesia, Sri Lanka	$28 million	83	
Season aggregates
7 systems	May 10–December 16		140 km/h (85 mph)	980 hPa (28.94 inHg)		$163 million	358	

== See also ==
- 2003 Atlantic hurricane season
- 2003 Pacific hurricane season
- 2003 Pacific typhoon season
- South-West Indian Ocean cyclone seasons: 2002–03, 2003–04
- Australian region cyclone seasons: 2002–03, 2003–04
- South Pacific cyclone seasons: 2002–03, 2003–04
