= False Divi Point =

Coordinates: 15°46′12″N 81°00′40″E

Location of False Divi Point in the Indian coast

False Divi Point is a low headland located at the northern terminus of the Coromandel Coast, within the state of Andhra Pradesh of southeastern India.

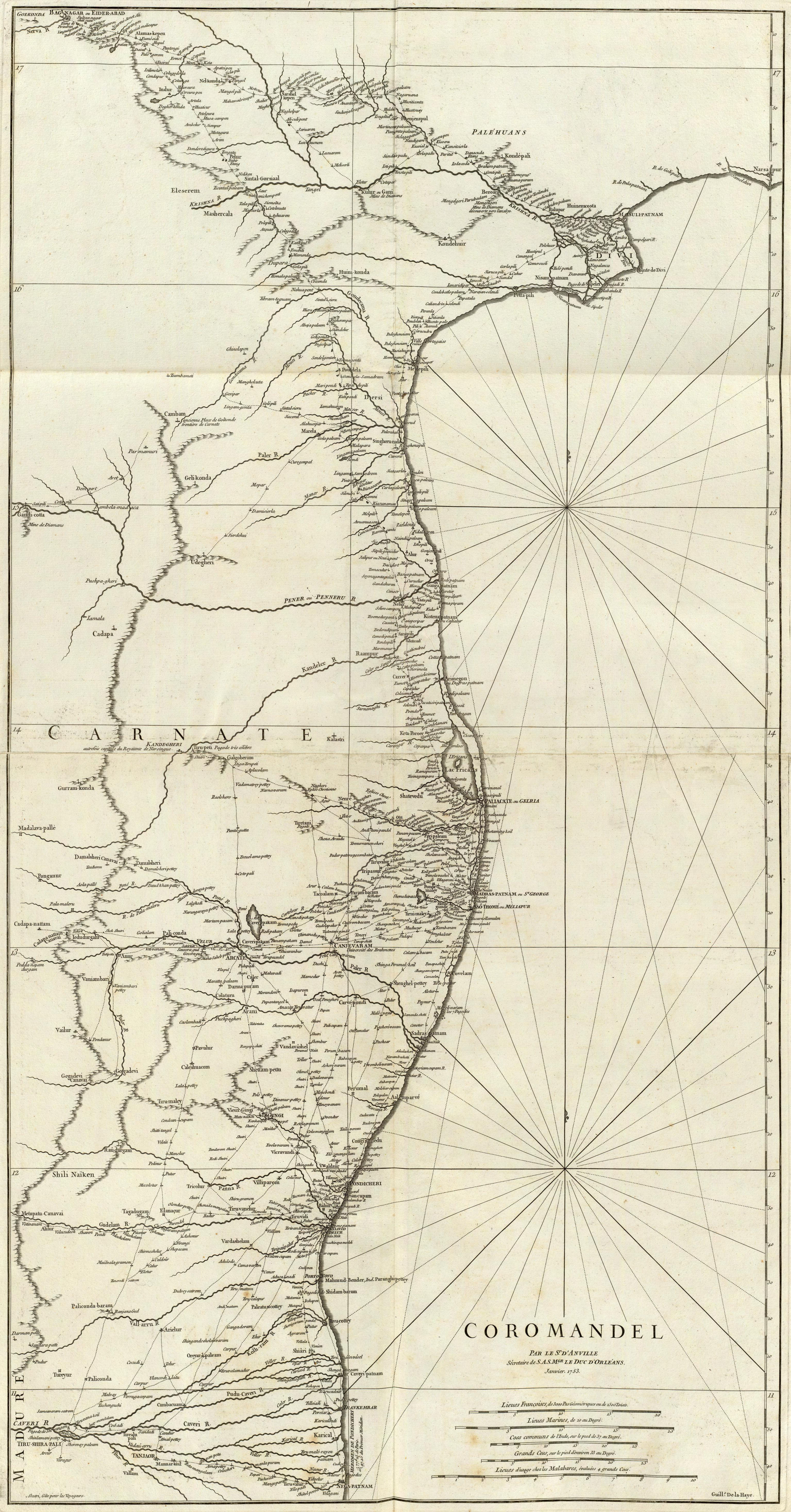
1753 map of the Coromandel Coast (in French)

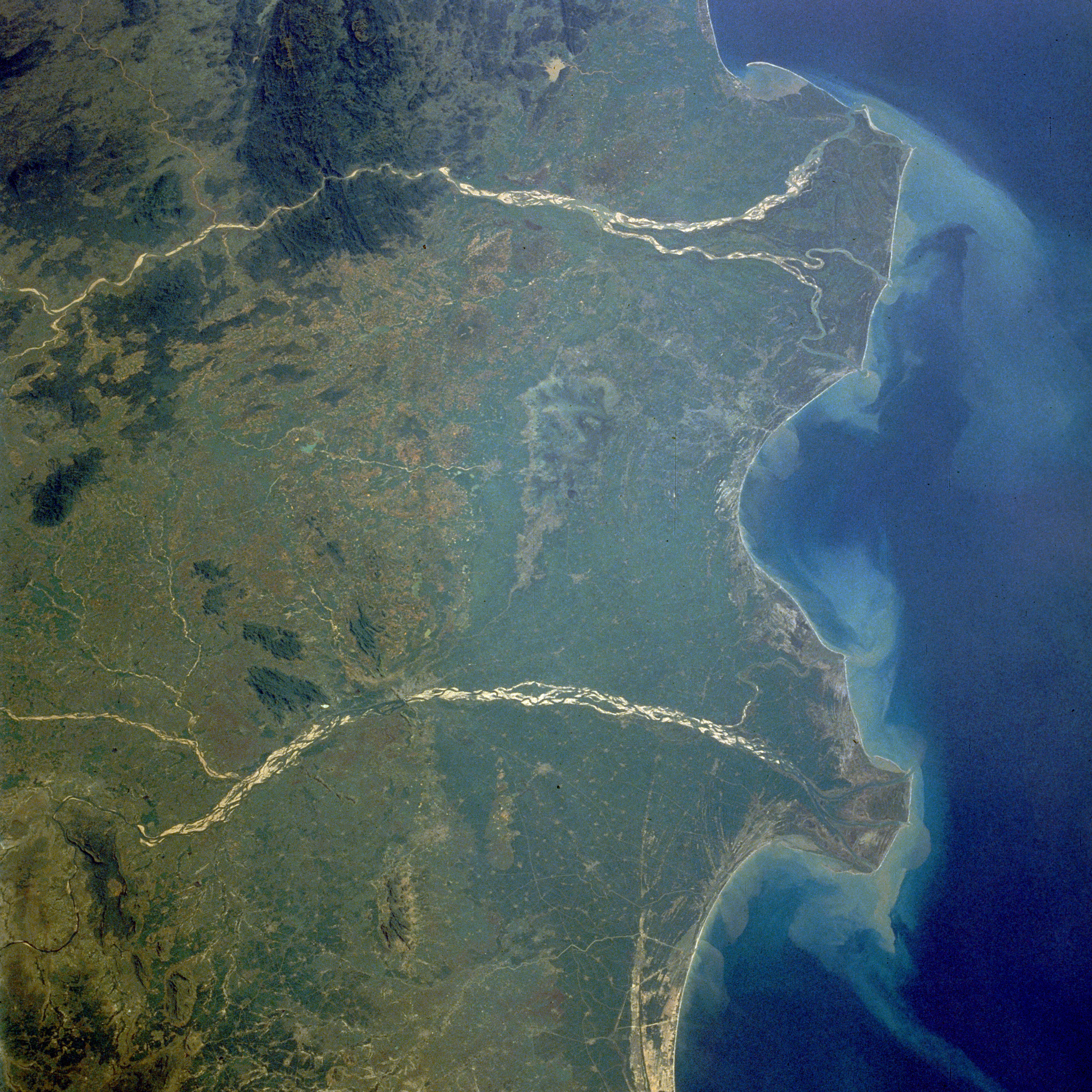
The Krishna River Delta (lower river system in image), with False Divi Point at eastern point.

== Geography ==
The headlands point is located at the eastern apex of the Krishna River Delta, within the South India Region. The area is low, swampy, and dominated by Mangrove wetlands habitats.

False Divi Point is used geographically to define northern end of the Coromandel Coast region.

== See also ==
- Geography of Andhra Pradesh
- 2003 North Indian Ocean cyclone season - Severe Cyclonic Storm (03B)
