= 2003 Sri Lanka cyclone =

Tropical cyclone

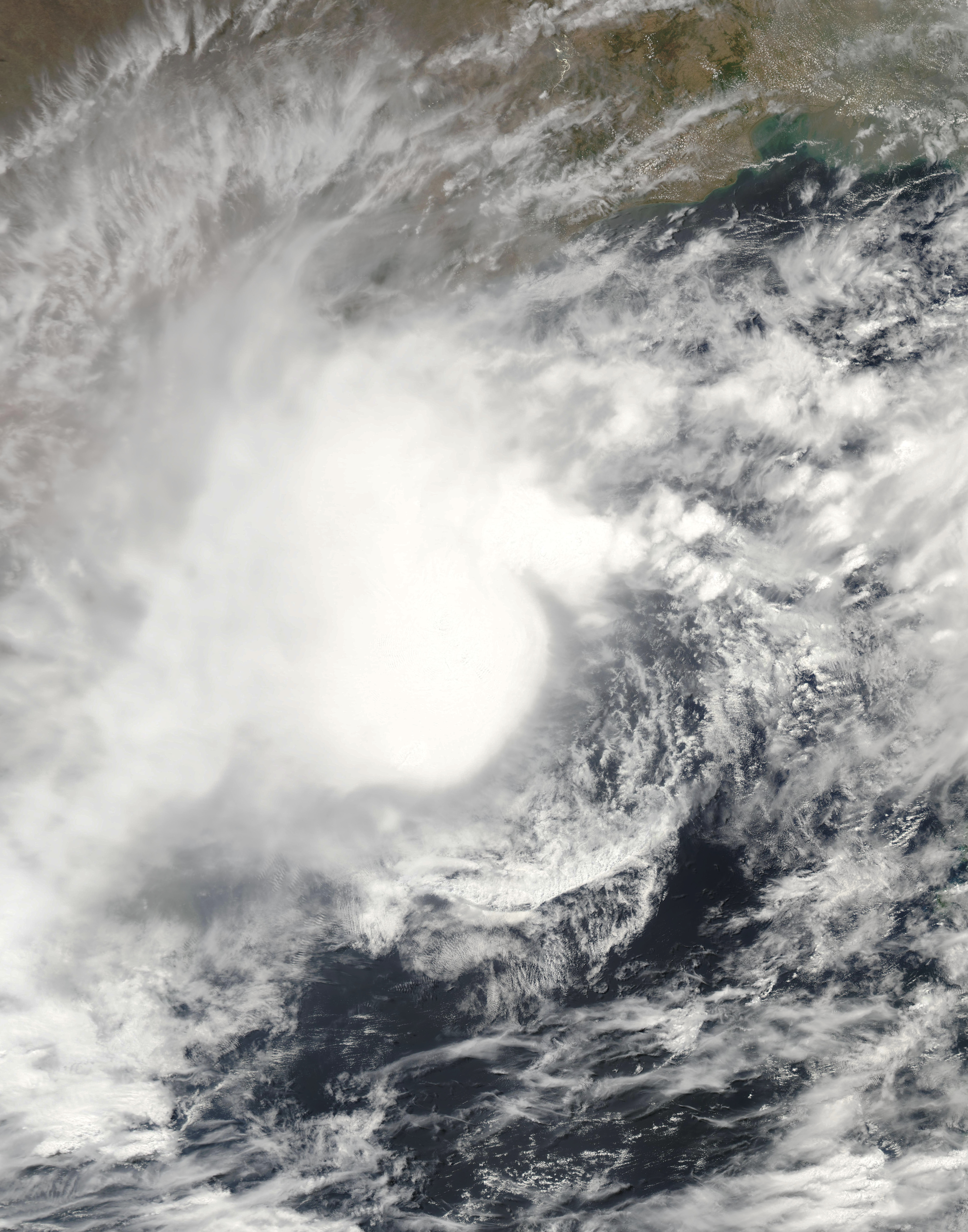
- Satellite image of the tropical storm on May 13

Meteorological history
- Formed: May 10, 2003
- Dissipated: May 20, 2003

Very severe cyclonic storm
- 3-minute sustained (IMD)
- Highest winds: 140 km/h (85 mph)
- Lowest pressure: 980 hPa (mbar); 28.94 inHg

Tropical storm
- 1-minute sustained (SSHWS/JTWC)
- Highest winds: 110 km/h (70 mph)
- Lowest pressure: 980 hPa (mbar); 28.94 inHg

Overall effects
- Fatalities: 260 total
- Damage: $135 million (2003 USD)
- Areas affected: Sri Lanka, India, Myanmar
- IBTrACS
- Part of the 2003 North Indian Ocean cyclone season

The 2003 Sri Lanka cyclone was a moderately powerful tropical cyclone that produced the worst flooding in Sri Lanka in 56 years. The first storm of the 2003 North Indian Ocean cyclone season, it developed over the Bay of Bengal on May 10. Favorable environmental conditions allowed the system to intensify steadily while moving northwestward. The storm reached peak maximum sustained winds of 140 km/h (85 mph) on May 13, making it a very severe cyclonic storm according to the India Meteorological Department (IMD), which is the official Regional Specialized Meteorological Center for the basin. The cyclone drifted north over the central Bay of Bengal, gradually weakening due to heightened wind shear. Turning eastward, the storm deteriorated to a deep depression on May 16 before it curved northeastward and re-intensified into a cyclonic storm. It came ashore in western Myanmar and dissipated over land the following day.

In the wake of prolonged precipitation during the first half of May, the cyclone produced torrential rains across southwest Sri Lanka while stationary in the central Bay of Bengal. The storm drew extensive moisture that coalesced in the mountainous portion of the island. A station at Ratnapura recorded 366.1 mm (14.41 in) of rainfall in 18 hours on May 17, including 99.8 mm (3.93 in) in one hour. In southwestern Sri Lanka, the rainfall caused flooding and landslides that destroyed 24,750 homes and damaged 32,426 others, displacing about 800,000 people. Overall damage totaled about $135 million (2003 USD), (Note: All currencies are in 2003 values of their respective currencies.) and there were 260 deaths. The cyclone also produced some rainfall in the Andaman and Nicobar Islands of India and along the country's eastern coast. The storm funneled moisture away from the mainland, which possibly contributed to a heat wave that killed 1,900 people, and dropped heavy rainfall in Myanmar.

== Meteorological history ==
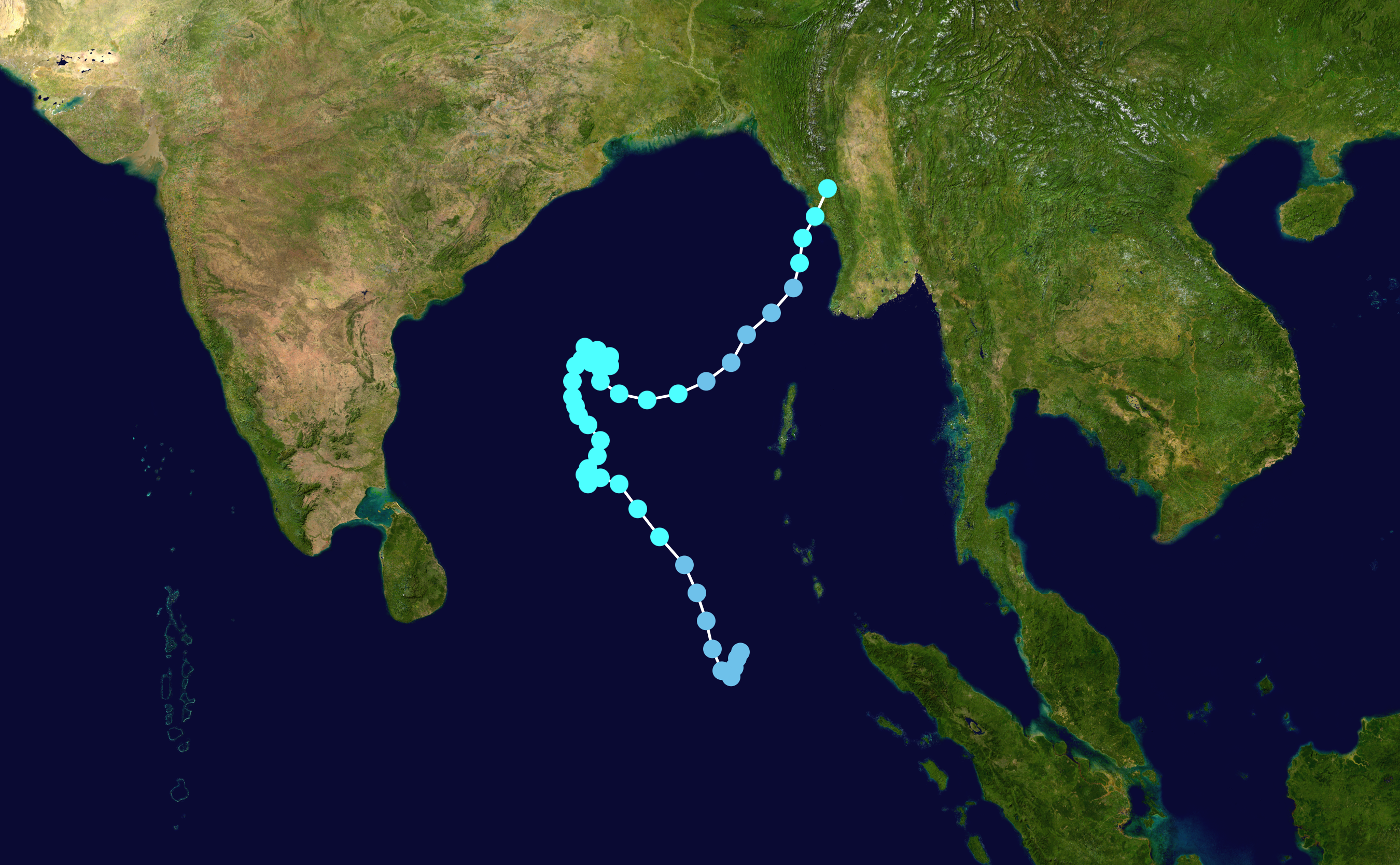
Map plotting the storm's track and intensity, according to the Saffir–Simpson scale Map key Saffir–Simpson scale Tropical depression (≤38 mph, ≤62 km/h) Tropical storm (39–73 mph, 63–118 km/h) Category 1 (74–95 mph, 119–153 km/h) Category 2 (96–110 mph, 154–177 km/h) Category 3 (111–129 mph, 178–208 km/h) Category 4 (130–156 mph, 209–251 km/h) Category 5 (≥157 mph, ≥252 km/h) Unknown Storm type Tropical cyclone Subtropical cyclone Extratropical cyclone, remnant low, tropical disturbance, or monsoon depression

Around May 6, the monsoon trough extended across the southern Bay of Bengal, producing a vast field of thunderstorm activity. A broad low-pressure area formed by the next day and remained nearly stationary. Over the next few days, the convection varied in intensity until becoming more organized around the nascent surface low on May 10. At 03:00 UTC on May 10, the India Meteorological Department (IMD) (Note: The India Meteorological Department is the official Regional Specialized Meteorological Center for the northern Indian Ocean.) reported the formation of a depression about 535 km (330 mi) west of Banda Aceh, Indonesia. Within nine hours, the depression further intensified into a deep depression. Around the same time, the system was classified as Tropical Cyclone 01B by the Joint Typhoon Warning Center. (Note: The Joint Typhoon Warning Center is a joint United States Navy – United States Air Force task force that issues tropical cyclone warnings for the northern Indian Ocean and other regions.)

With warm sea surface temperatures, a formidable anticyclone aloft, and low wind shear, the system continued to mature as it tracked northwestward. Early on May 11, the deep depression strengthened into a cyclonic storm – marked by maximum sustained winds of at least 65 km/h (40 mph) (Note: The IMD gauges winds over a three-minute average.) – and later in the day into a severe cyclonic storm. Simultaneously, the system was driven toward the north by a ridge of high pressure to the northeast. At the time, the cyclone was located about 700 km (430 mi) east of Sri Lanka. The storm continued to intensify, becoming a very severe cyclonic storm on May 12. That day, the JTWC upgraded Tropical Cyclone 01B to the equivalence of a minimal hurricane with winds of 120 km/h (75 mph). (Note: The JTWC gauges winds over a one-minute average.) In post-season analysis, however, the agency revised the storm's maximum winds to 110 km/h (70 mph). At 06:00 UTC on May 13, the IMD estimated that the storm attained peak winds of 140 km/h (85 mph). The intensity estimate was based on a satellite-derived Dvorak number of 4.5, limited chiefly by the lack of an eye feature.

After peaking in intensity, the storm began weakening due to increasing easterly wind shear from the ridge to the north, displacing the center of circulation from the deepest convection. Early on May 14, the IMD downgraded the storm to a severe cyclonic storm. Around this time, steering currents slackened, and the cyclone meandered northward over the central Bay of Bengal. By late on May 14, convection had largely dissipated, with the exception of a small area near the center, and the system weakened to minimal cyclonic storm status. Thunderstorm activity continued to wax and wane as the storm turned to the southeastward, though persistent hostile conditions caused the storm to weaken further to a deep depression on May 16. As the nearby ridge translated eastward, the depression was able to move more steadily to the east and later to the northeast, passing northwest of the Andaman Islands on May 18. On the next day, the deep depression re-intensified into a cyclonic storm, reaching a secondary peak with winds of 85 km/h (55 mph). At about 10:00 UTC on May 19, the storm made landfall close to Kyaukpyu, Ramree Island, in western Myanmar. The storm rapidly weakened into a depression and later degenerated into a low-pressure area on May 20, and was no longer discernible on satellite imagery by the next day.

== Preparations and impact ==
=== Sri Lanka ===
Location map of Sri Lanka

Due to the significant distance between Sri Lanka and the Bay of Bengal storm, no cyclone warnings were posted. The India-based National Centre for Medium Range Weather Forecasting anticipated the flood event three days in advance. However, the Sri Lankan government did not issue the first flood warnings until May 17, the same day that the flooding began. Many residents learned about the impending floods through loudspeakers and word of mouth, although some were alerted by television or radio. About 8,000 people evacuated on May 18, utilizing schools and public buildings as emergency shelters. The precipitation occurred in the wake of an already rainy period; a station near the Kalu River reported over 600 mm (24 in) of rainfall in the first 15 days of May.

While the storm was nearly stationary in the central Bay of Bengal, the southwesterly flow drew abundant moisture over Sri Lanka to produce severe flooding. In the island's mountainous southwestern portion, the winds across the island produced heavy rainfall rates through a process known as orographic lift, mostly occurring on May 17–18. Throughout May 2003, the highest rainfall in the country was 899 mm (35.4 in) at Gonapenigala Iranganie Estate. A station at Ratnapura recorded 718 mm (28.3 in) of precipitation in the month, of which 366.1 mm (14.41 in) fell over an 18‑hour period on May 17; at the same station, there was a peak hourly rainfall total of 99.8 mm (3.93 in). These were the heaviest rains on the island since 1947. Rainfall was primarily concentrated in southwestern Sri Lanka, with a rain shadow farther inland that resulted in minimal precipitation in and Matale. After the Kalu River overflowed, floodwaters reached 3 m (9.8 ft) deep in Ratnapura City, submerging the first floors of most homes and persisting for about three days. Landslides created a temporary natural dam on the river that washed away a bridge when it broke. Along the Gin River, flood waters inundated the surrounding terrain up to 2 m (6.6 ft) deep, covered roadways, and complicated evacuations. In Hambantota District, the inundation occurred after an ongoing drought, which amplified flood-related damage. Although the flooding was severe in the southwestern portion of Sri Lanka, effects were minimal in the central and north-central regions, and there was no severe flooding in the capital city of Colombo.

Since the previously wet conditions had saturated soils, the rains related to the cyclone caused severe flooding and landslides, mostly in Ratnapura and Nuwara Eliya districts. A landslide in Batugoda killed 81 people, and at least 125 people died in Ratnapura. The floods increased river levels in Hambantota, Matara, Galle, and Kalutara districts, persisting until May 30 in Matara. Many roads were damaged, including the one that links Ratnapura to Colombo. About 100 schools were destroyed and another 200 were damaged, and some health facilities lost their equipment. Flooding from the cyclone destroyed 53,300 hectares (132,000 acres) of tea crops, representing an estimated 20–30% loss for the year in the low country. Farmers in the affected areas also lost some of their rice paddies to the high waters, although only about 3% of the rice crop in the region was damaged, so no impact on the rice harvest was expected. Many areas lost electricity and telephone service, and there were disruptions to food and water supplies.

Throughout Sri Lanka, the floods destroyed at least 24,750 homes and damaged 32,426 others, displacing about 800,000 people, many of whom lost everything they owned. Total damage was estimated at $135 million (2003 USD), primarily to homes and roads. Across the island, floods related to the cyclone killed 260 people. Most of the deaths were along the nation's southern coast where the floods occurred, primarily along the Kalu River, and were mainly farmers. Levees helped drain floodwaters where systems were already in place.

=== Elsewhere ===
In its formative stages, the storm produced moderate rainfall in the Andaman and Nicobar Islands, totaling 70 mm (2.8 in) at Mayabunder. Later, as the storm was approaching Myanmar, it dropped 89 mm (3.5 in) of rainfall on Hut Bay. Several stations in Tamil Nadu reported light precipitation, including a total of 98 mm (3.9 in) at Adirampattinam. Along the coast of Odisha, the fringes of the cyclonic storm dropped light rainfall, reaching 53 mm (2.1 in) at Swampatna. As the storm made landfall in Myanmar, it produced heavy rainfall in Rakhine State, signalling an early start to the monsoon season.

The slow movement of the storm altered the atmospheric flow over southeastern India. It replaced the easterly maritime winds over southeast coast of India(TN and AP) and brought dry northwesterly winds from the North India which brought heatwave like conditions along North TN and South AP. Due to this, Chennai recorded 45C on May 31 breaking a record of 44.1C set in 1998. According to the IMD, the cyclone "might have caused the severe heat wave conditions prevailing over the coastal Andhra Pradesh" from May into early June, killing up to 1,400 people, and increasing air temperatures to 50 °C (122 °F).

== Aftermath ==
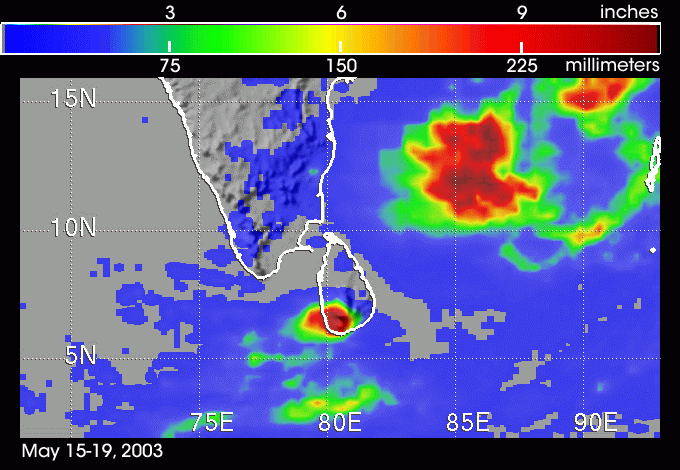
Satellite-derived precipitation rates related to the storm from May 15–19; Sri Lanka is in the bottom center with the highest totals in a dark shade of red

In the immediate aftermath of the flooding in Sri Lanka, the country's air force, army, and navy, as well as police forces, operated search and rescue missions. The navy and air force collected residents stranded in trees and on roofs, and were later assisted by the Indian military. However, the lack of electricity and the damaged infrastructure hampered relief work. In the hardest hit area of Ratnapura, there was a shortage of doctors, prompting officials to request help from adjacent towns. There were increased reports of diarrhea, viral flu, and typhoid in the aftermath of the floods. Mobile health crews treated over 44,000 residents, which helped reduce the spread of disease. Residents in one village went without food for three days, and in the storm's aftermath, many were also without access to clean water. By May 19, flooding had begun to recede in the worst affected areas, allowing workers to repair roads. The government released RS6 million (LKR, US$62,500) for immediate relief, and also provided RS15,000 (LKR, US$156) toward funeral expenses for each death. From May 22–25, the country's legislature had reduced sessions so members could return to their districts. By the end of May 2003, the government had allocated RS17.29 million (LKR, US$180,000) for relief measures, including RS27,000 (LKR US$280) for each family to rebuild houses. The Sri Lankan government also set up a four-person task force to manage flood relief. The local Red Cross chapter utilized emergency supplies to distribute 10,000 food packages while also deploying trained volunteers to assist in the disaster areas. The Red Cross ultimately distributed about 26,000 loaves of bread, 862 kg (1,900 lb) of sugar, and 1,775 kg (3,913 lb) of rice, among other supplies. By May 20, the Sri Lankan air force had distributed 35 tons of food, using eight helicopters to airdrop parcels. Red Cross workers cleaned hundreds of contaminated wells in the region, thereby restoring clean water access; this task was finished by August. By May 16, or nine days after the floods began, power was restored to about 95% of areas, and roads were gradually rebuilt. Road access to most villages was restored by May 26, with the exception of Matara. There, the ongoing floods prompted officials to close schools to reduce the spread of disease. After the floods largely subsided, the World Socialist Web Site criticized the Sri Lankan government for not having better disaster management in place, as well as noting that deforestation and gem mining contributed to the landslides. A Red Cross report in August 2003 noted the swift work to bring relief to the affected citizens, while also commenting that the floods displayed the country's problems with disaster mitigation.

On May 19, the Red Cross launched an appeal to the international community for assistance. A day prior, the Red Cross allocated CHF50,000 to buy relief supplies, while the United Nations Office for the Coordination of Humanitarian Affairs provided a $50,000 grant. In the days after the floods, the government of India sent a ship with inflatable dinghies and medical supplies. A total of 18 countries or local Red Crosses sent Fr.2.3 million CHF worth of cash to Sri Lanka. Sweden sent kr800,000 (2003 SEK) toward relief transport and distribution. The government of Japan sent ¥19.8 million yen worth of tents, sheets, and other supplies to the country. The Iranian Red Cross sent $65,625 (USD) worth of blankets and tents to Sri Lanka, which helped about 240 families. Australia's government sent about $400,000 (AUD) to UNICEF to help rebuild the damaged schools and other social services. The European Community Humanitarian Aid Office donated about €800,000 (US$944,000) to the country. The World Food Programme distributed meals to about 10,000 families, while the World Health Organization provided water purification tablets, typhoid vaccines, and health kits to about 100,000 people. During a peace agreement amid the ongoing civil war, the Tamil Tigers in Sri Lanka sent trucks with clothing and food to the affected areas. In July 2004, the Asian Development Bank provided $12.5 million of the $17.5 million needed to repair the damaged infrastructure, while the Sri Lankan government provided the remaining $5 million.

== See also ==
- Cyclone Viyaru, which took a similar track in May 2013
- Geography of Sri Lanka
