= Kalingapatnam =

Kalingapatnam Kalinga Patana
- Village
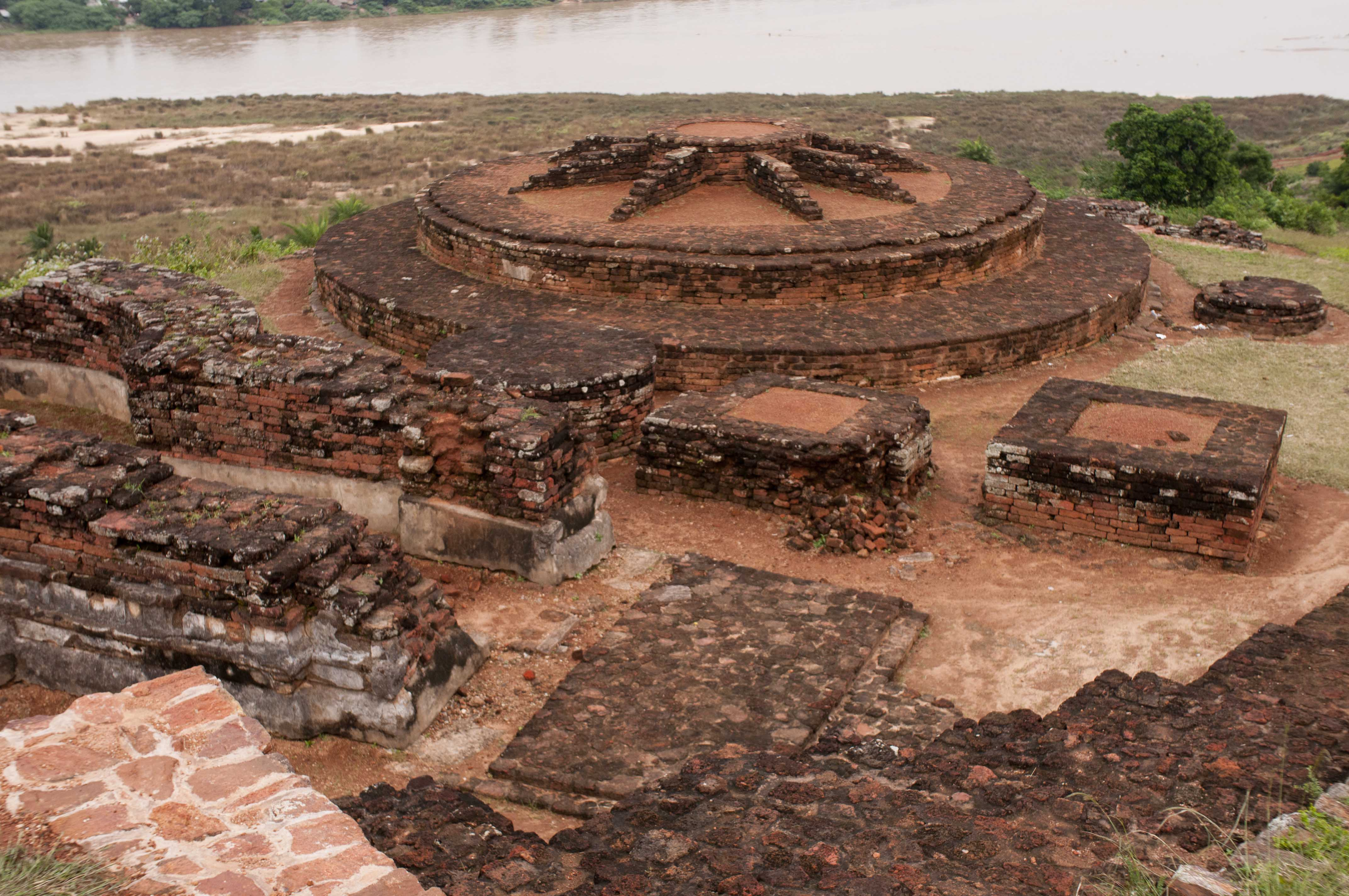
- Salihundam Buddhist site near Kalingapatnam
- Interactive map of Kalingapatnam
- Location in Andhra Pradesh, India
- Coordinates: 18°20′30″N 84°07′15″E
- Country: India
- State: Andhra Pradesh
- Region: Srikakulam
- Mandal: Gara

Area
  - Total: 6.51 km^{2} (2.51 sq mi)

Population (2011)
  - Total: 6,459
  - Density: 992/km^{2} (2,570/sq mi)

Languages
  - Official: Telugu
- Time zone: UTC+5:30 (IST)
- PIN: 532406
- Telephone code: 08942
- Vehicle Registration: AP30 (Former); AP39 (from 30 January 2019)

Kalingapatnam is a village in Srikakulam district of the Indian state of Andhra Pradesh. It is located in Gara mandal of Srikakulam revenue division. It has one of the major beach sand deposits of the state. In the medieval era it was famous for an ancient port city of Kalinga. Kalingapatnam is located at a distance of 26 km from the district headquarters and 17 km from Singupuram.

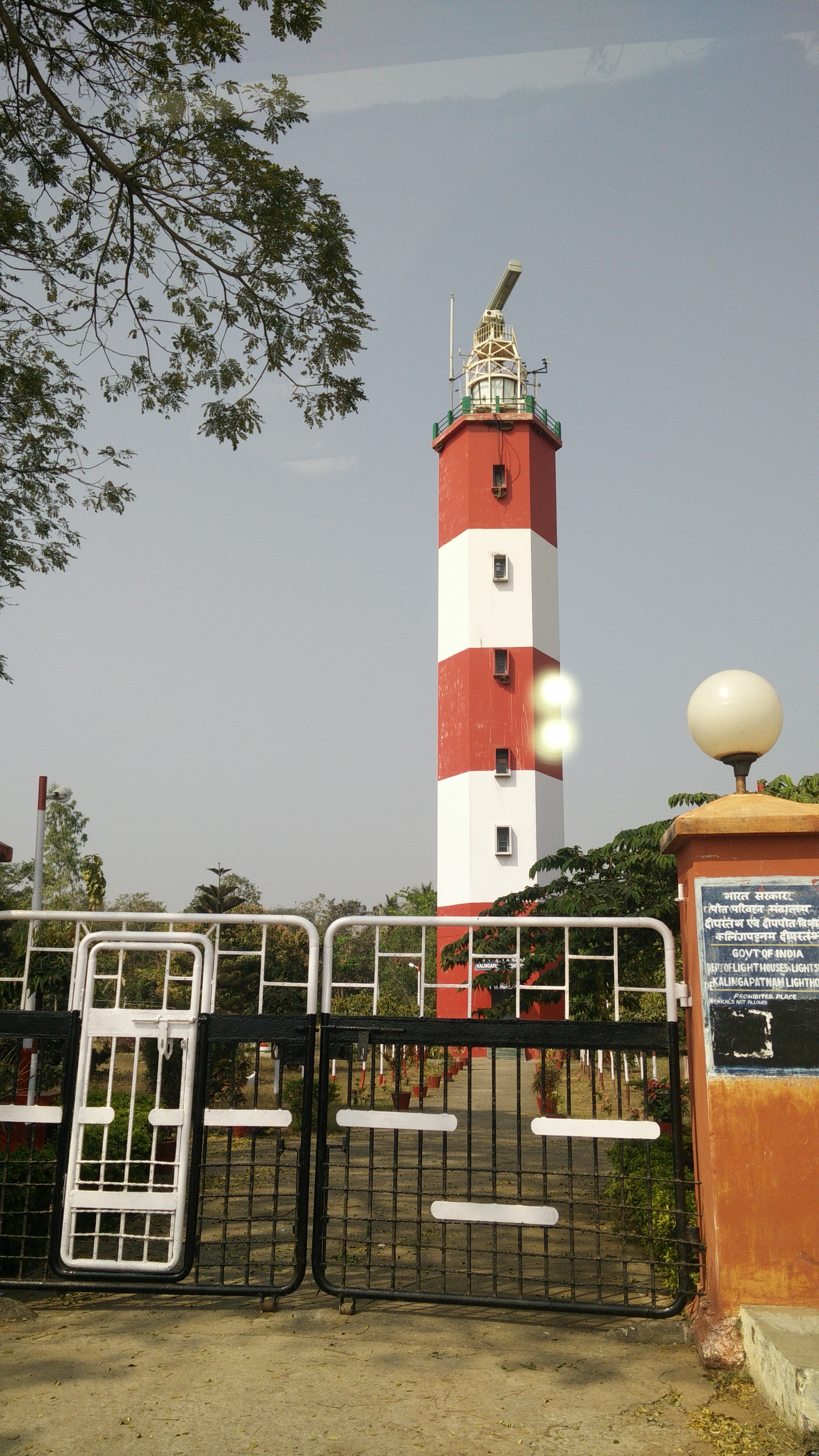
Kalingapatnam light house

Dargah Shariff of Shaik Madeena Acquiline is situated at this place.

== History ==
Kalingapatnam was one of ancient Kalinga's harbour villages. European merchants disembarked from the ships and made it their port. It was a minor port and Europeans resided here during East India Company regime. Until 1958, huge ships from Malaysia and Singapore arrived at this port. Perfumes, textiles etc. were exported to other countries from here. There was a huge coco plantation spread across the local beaches that were also exported. Kalingapatana port was closed during British rule in India to avoid other invaders entering the country. However, the lighthouse constructed by the British at Kalingapatana port stands as a witness to the European regime.

== Climate ==
Climate data for Kalingapatnam (1991–2020, extremes 1906–2020)
Month	Jan	Feb	Mar	Apr	May	Jun	Jul	Aug	Sep	Oct	Nov	Dec	Year
Record high °C (°F)	34.9 (94.8)	37.8 (100.0)	38.9 (102.0)	41.7 (107.1)	42.0 (107.6)	42.3 (108.1)	41.5 (106.7)	39.8 (103.6)	38.0 (100.4)	36.6 (97.9)	34.8 (94.6)	34.4 (93.9)	42.3 (108.1)
Mean daily maximum °C (°F)	27.7 (81.9)	30.0 (86.0)	32.0 (89.6)	32.9 (91.2)	33.8 (92.8)	33.1 (91.6)	31.7 (89.1)	31.8 (89.2)	32.1 (89.8)	31.3 (88.3)	29.4 (84.9)	27.9 (82.2)	31.1 (88.0)
Mean daily minimum °C (°F)	17.4 (63.3)	19.8 (67.6)	23.2 (73.8)	25.4 (77.7)	26.9 (80.4)	26.7 (80.1)	25.9 (78.6)	25.8 (78.4)	25.6 (78.1)	24.1 (75.4)	20.7 (69.3)	17.6 (63.7)	23.2 (73.8)
Record low °C (°F)	9.5 (49.1)	12.8 (55.0)	15.4 (59.7)	18.2 (64.8)	20.5 (68.9)	19.8 (67.6)	20.4 (68.7)	21.4 (70.5)	18.2 (64.8)	17.8 (64.0)	10.3 (50.5)	11.2 (52.2)	9.5 (49.1)
Average rainfall mm (inches)	6.2 (0.24)	13.8 (0.54)	6.4 (0.25)	21.4 (0.84)	76.4 (3.01)	142.2 (5.60)	155.6 (6.13)	163.2 (6.43)	191.5 (7.54)	231.4 (9.11)	97.7 (3.85)	10.7 (0.42)	1,116.5 (43.96)
Average rainy days	0.4	0.8	0.5	1.6	3.3	6.5	9.2	9.8	9.0	7.9	3.0	0.7	52.5
Average relative humidity (%) (at 17:30 IST)	71	73	77	81	81	81	83	84	83	78	71	67	77
Source: India Meteorological Department

== Tourism ==
Kalingapatnam Beach is the place where river Vamsadhara empties into Bay of Bengal. Buddhist stupas were excavated by the Archaeological department at Salihundam, Ramateertham etc.

A new Shiva temple is being built near the Kalingapatnam Beach towards Machilesam, by K.J.Rao & Co.
