= Hurricane Isidore =

Category 3 Atlantic hurricane in 2002

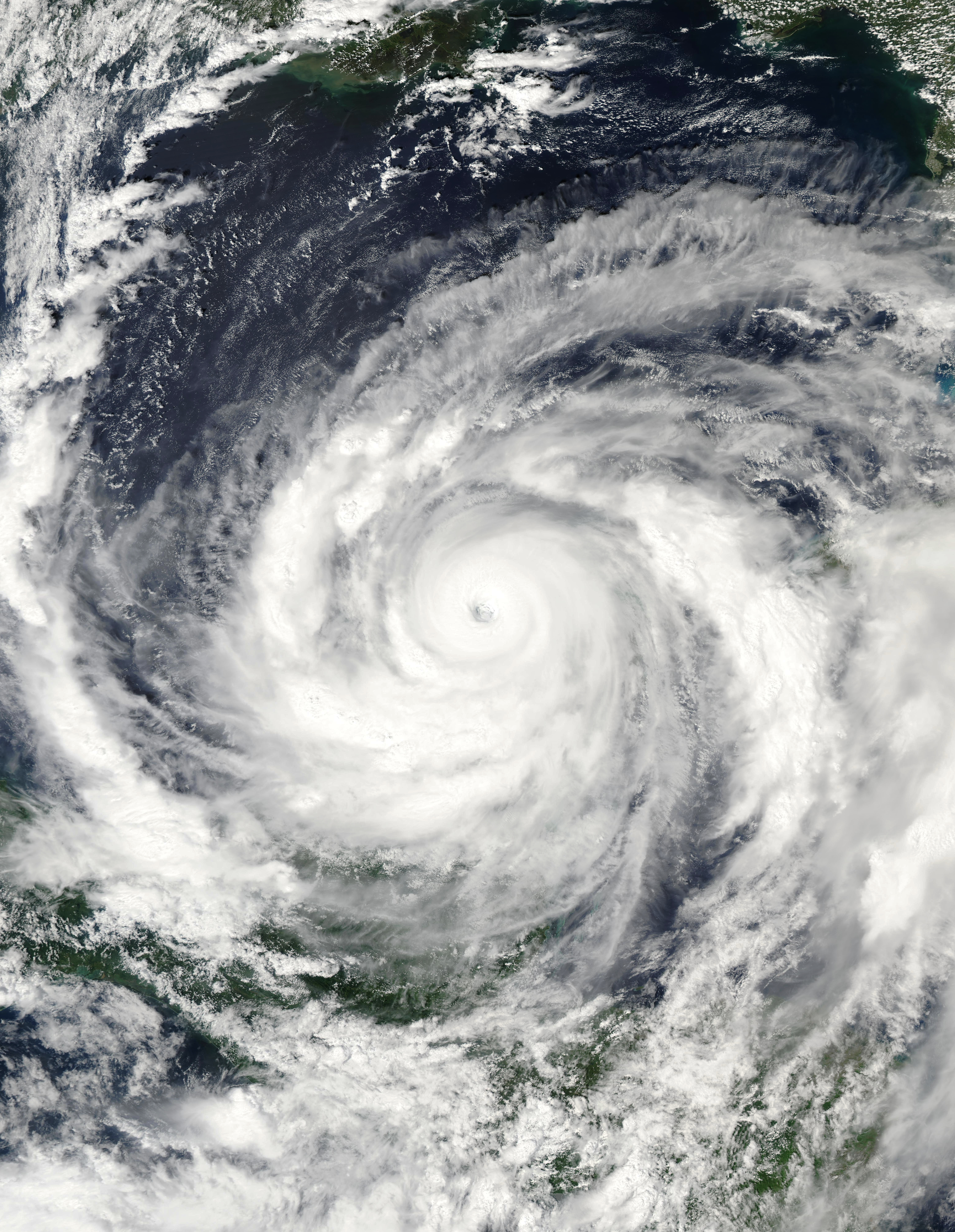
- Isidore at peak intensity making landfall in Mexico on September 22

Meteorological history
- Formed: September 14, 2002
- Dissipated: September 27, 2002

Category 3 major hurricane
- 1-minute sustained (SSHWS/NWS)
- Highest winds: 125 mph (205 km/h)
- Lowest pressure: 934 mbar (hPa); 27.58 inHg

Overall effects
- Fatalities: 22 (19 direct, 3 indirect)
- Damage: $1.28 billion (2002 USD)
- Areas affected: Venezuela, Jamaica, Cayman Islands, Cuba, Yucatán Peninsula, Louisiana, Mississippi
- IBTrACS
- Part of the 2002 Atlantic hurricane season

Hurricane Isidore was a powerful tropical cyclone that caused widespread flooding and heavy damage across Mexico, Cuba, and the United States in September 2002. The ninth named storm and the second hurricane in the 2002 Atlantic hurricane season, and the fifth of eight named storms to occur in September of that year, Isidore peaked as a Category 3 hurricane, causing damage, as well as four fatalities in Jamaica, Cuba, Mexico, and the United States. Isidore is also noted for threatening to strike the northern Gulf Coast as a Category 4 hurricane, however, the storm struck the region as a moderately strong tropical storm, due to a track change that brought the storm over the Yucatán Peninsula for over a day, which significantly weakened the cyclone in the process. The primary impact from the storm was the heavy rainfall, which fell across southeast Mexico, and also from the central United States Gulf coast into the Ohio Valley.

== Meteorological history ==
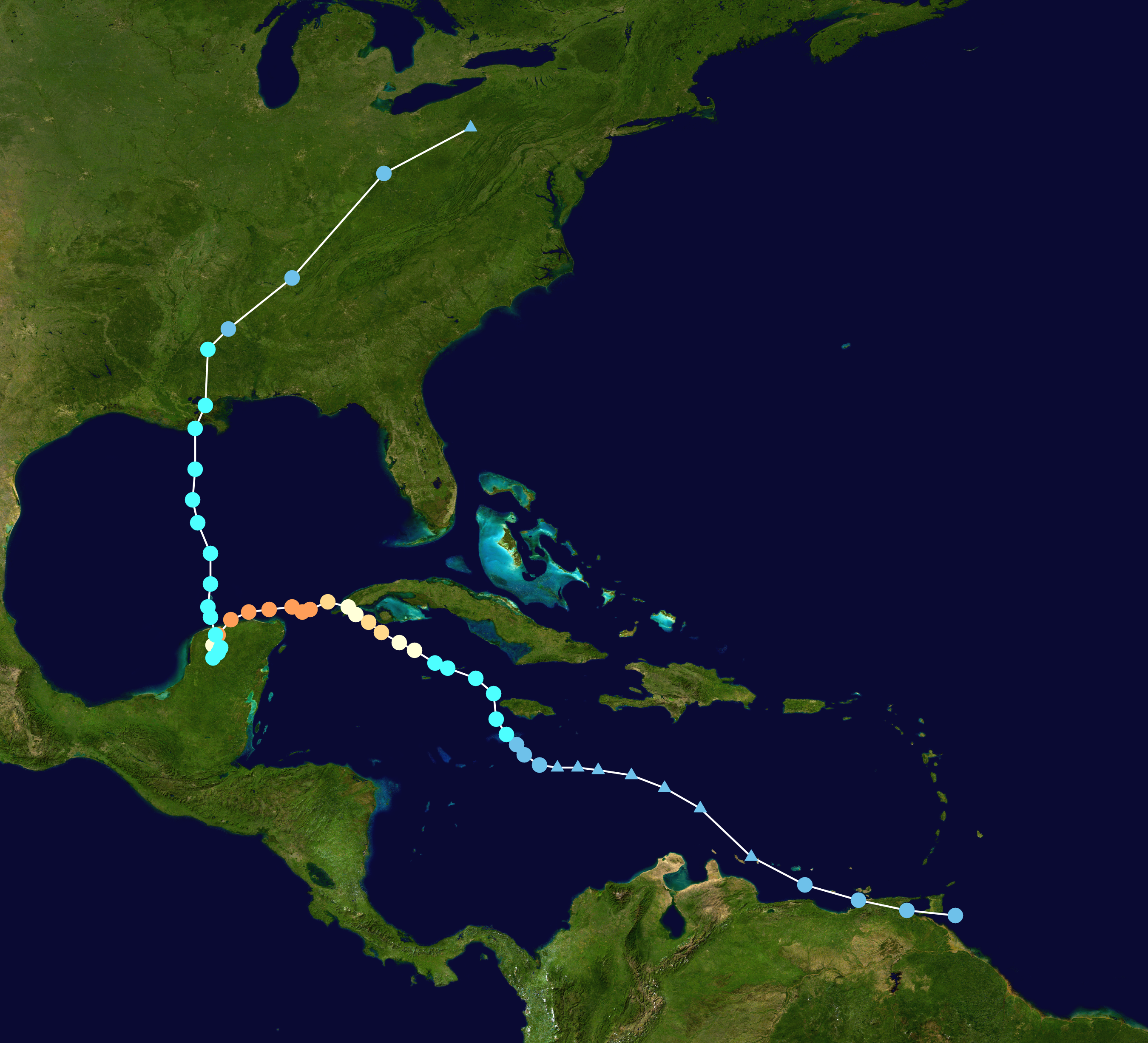
Map plotting the storm's track and intensity, according to the Saffir–Simpson scale Map key Saffir–Simpson scale Tropical depression (≤38 mph, ≤62 km/h) Tropical storm (39–73 mph, 63–118 km/h) Category 1 (74–95 mph, 119–153 km/h) Category 2 (96–110 mph, 154–177 km/h) Category 3 (111–129 mph, 178–208 km/h) Category 4 (130–156 mph, 209–251 km/h) Category 5 (≥157 mph, ≥252 km/h) Unknown Storm type Tropical cyclone Subtropical cyclone Extratropical cyclone, remnant low, tropical disturbance, or monsoon depression

On September 9, a tropical wave moved off the coast of Africa. Despite moving through a dry environment, its convection became organized as an anticyclone developed over the wave. On September 14, convection was well-organized enough around a small closed wind circulation to classify the system as Tropical Depression Ten near Trinidad and Tobago. Land interaction from Venezuela later weakened the depression back to a tropical wave. The wave continued west-northwestward through the Caribbean, and redeveloped into a tropical depression on September 17 while 140 miles (230 km) south of Jamaica.

Embedded within a weak steering current, it drifted to the northwest, and strengthened into Tropical Storm Isidore on September 18 near Jamaica. After grazing the island, it quickly intensified to a hurricane late on September 19 while south of Cuba. Isidore's maximum sustained winds reached 100 mph (160 km/h) near the Isle of Youth, and weakened slightly to an 85 mph (137 km/h) hurricane as it made landfall on Cabo Frances late on September 20. The hurricane crossed the island, then slowed as it moved westward across the Gulf of Mexico. Favorable conditions aloft with warm water temperatures allowed Isidore to quickly intensify to a peak of 125 mph (201 km/h) winds on September 21.

Despite Dvorak satellite estimates of 145 mph (233 km/h), reconnaissance aircraft indicated Isidore remained a 125 mph (201 km/h) Category 3 hurricane, with pressures dropping to 934 mbar (27.6 inHg), typical of a Category 4 hurricane. It is the lowest minimum pressure ever observed for an Atlantic hurricane which did not exceed Category 3 intensity. With nearly ideal conditions for development, Isidore was forecast to reach winds of 150 mph (240 km/h) over the northern Gulf of Mexico. High pressures to its north forced it southward, and Isidore made landfall at Telchac Puerto in Yucatán as a major hurricane on September 22. It weakened rapidly as it nearly stalled over Yucatán, and was only a minimal tropical storm after being inland for 30 hours.

Tropical Storm Isidore (left), Lili (middle) and Kyle on September 25

The inner core of convection collapsed while over southeast Mexico, and upon moving northward and reaching the Gulf of Mexico again, it was a large but weak tropical storm. Conditions favored significant strengthening, but Isidore did not redevelop central convection until reaching the northern Gulf of Mexico. The strengthening system hit Grand Isle, Louisiana on September 26 with maximum sustained winds of 65 mph (105 km/h), but weakened quickly into a tropical depression after moving inland. The system raced to the northeast, and became an extratropical cyclone on September 27 before becoming absorbed in a frontal zone over Pennsylvania that night.

== Preparations ==
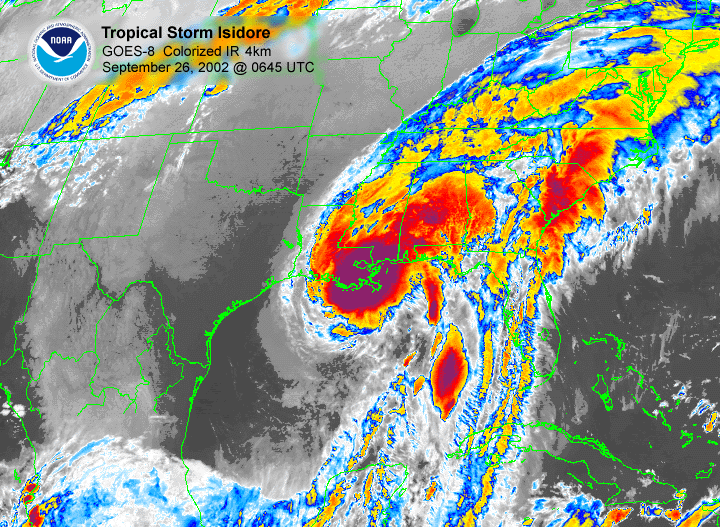
Tropical Storm Isidore making landfall in Louisiana on September 26

Before Isidore became a hurricane, there were fears that the storm would end up being a significant threat. The upper-level environment ahead of the storm was very favorable, and the oceanic heat content was very high. Just ten months after the destructive Hurricane Michelle, Hurricane Isidore threatened to cause similar effects in Cuba. In preparation for the storm, about 292,000 people and thousands of farm animals were evacuated in the Pinar del Río province. Hurricane Warnings were posted about 48 hours before landfall, leaving ample time to prepare for the storm.

Once in the Gulf of Mexico, Hurricane Isidore became a major Category 3 storm with winds of 125 miles per hour (201 km/h). The forecasts then predicted Isidore to move westward in the Gulf of Mexico for a few days, before turning northward towards the Gulf Coast as what was predicted by then to be a strong Category 4 hurricane. Initially expected to remain north of the peninsula, hurricane warnings were issued just over a day prior to landfall, with no watch preceding Isidore's passage. More than 70,000 people were evacuated, and ports on the Gulf coast of Yucatán were closed. Mexican authorities declared a state of emergency prior to the arrival of the storm. Due to Isidore's unexpected southward turn into the Yucatán Peninsula, Isidore weakened significantly to a tropical storm which limited potential damage along the United States Gulf Coast. In preparation for the hurricane, the Red Cross mobilized its members across Texas, Alabama, Louisiana, Mississippi, and Florida days before Isidore's expected landfall. Volunteers were sent in the days prior to ensure families had a family disaster plan and a disaster supplies kit in their household. Hurricane watches raised for the United States Gulf coast between Cameron, Louisiana and Pascagoula, Mississippi late on the morning of September 24 were discontinued early on the morning of September 25, when the storm was no longer expected to restrengthen into a hurricane.

== Impact ==
=== Caribbean islands ===
In the Windward Islands, Isidore was a weak tropical depression that caused no reported damage or casualties. The Cayman Islands reported tropical storm force winds, and likely experienced flooding to some degree, but Isidore caused no reported damage or casualties. Isidore brought heavy rains to Jamaica, totalling 27.2 inches (690 mm) at Cotton Tree Gully.

=== Cuba ===
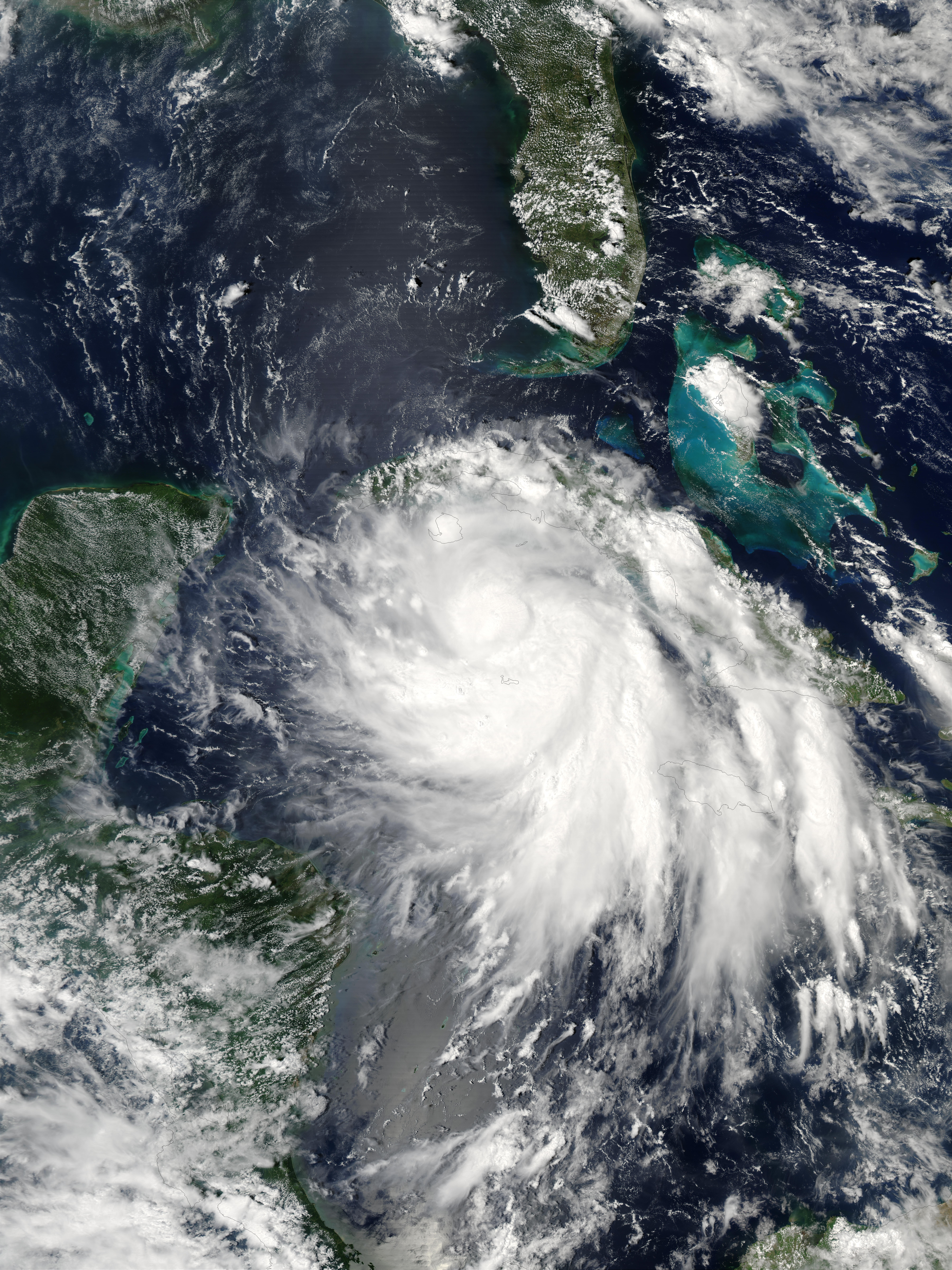
Hurricane Isidore approaching Cuba on September 19

Hurricane Isidore brought torrential rainfall, with many areas reporting over 1 foot (300 mm) of rain. The maximum reported was 21.7 inches (550 mm) at Isabel Rubio in western Cuba. The rainfall, combined with a 12 feet (3.7 m) storm surge, destroyed 77 houses, caused power outages, uprooted trees and blew off roofs. Over 130 tobacco drying houses were affected to some degree, damaging valuable tobacco stock. A total of 24,000 metric tons of citrus and 132 metric tons of coffee were lost from the storm. Thousands of livestock perished. No deaths were reported.

=== Southeast Mexico ===
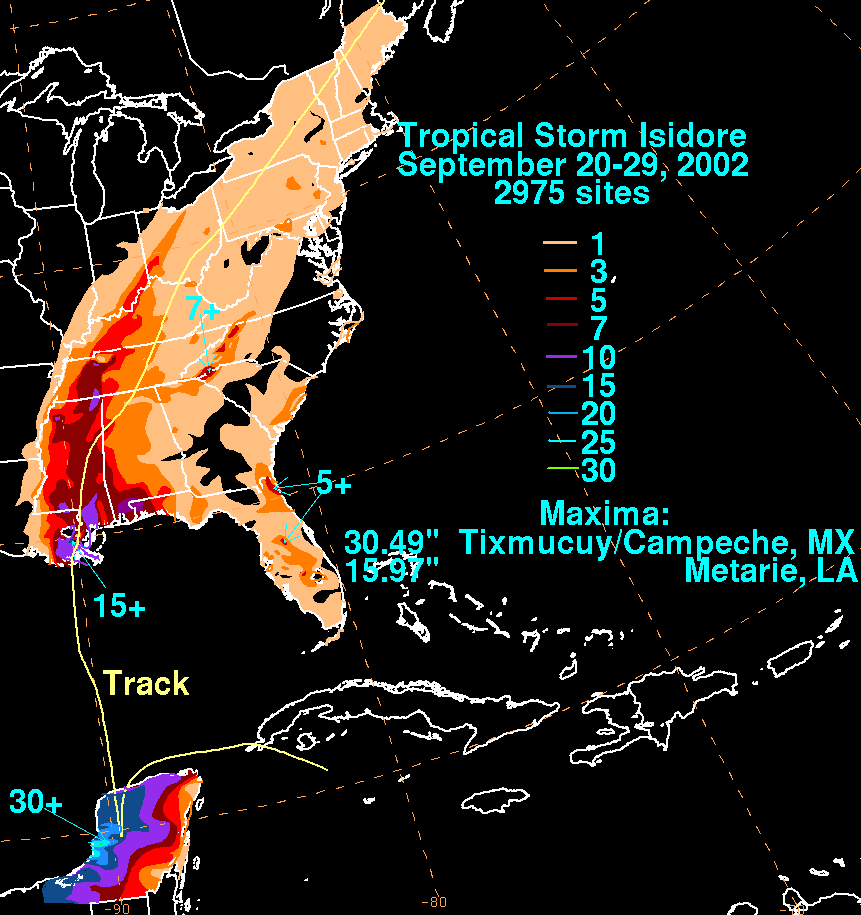
Rainfall totals in Mexico and the United States

Hurricane Isidore was one of only four storms to hit the north side of the Yucatán since records have been kept. It was the first tropical cyclone to hit the area since Tropical Depression Greta in 1970, the first tropical storm since 1935, the first hurricane since 1888, and only major hurricane to ever hit the area.

The storm shut down the oil production of PEMEX, the Mexican state oil company. Drilling operations, as well as exports from Mexico, stopped for one week which cost the oil company US$108.7 million. The Gulf Coast island of Isla Arena was nearly covered by Isidore's storm surge. Its residents evacuated prior to the storm's passage.

Hurricane Isidore hit near Mérida, Yucatán, as a 125 miles per hour (201 km/h) hurricane, and remained over the area for around 36 hours. Over 30 inches (760 mm) of rainfall fell, with the maximum recorded near Campeche. The storm surge reached as high as 6 metres (20 ft) over southern portions of Yucatán state. Nearly one-third of all fishing vessels were damaged by Isidore. Nearly 36,500 houses were destroyed in Yucatán from the intense winds, 83,000 homes damaged, and 500,000 were left homeless. Downed trees and power lines were common over much of the northern Yucatán Peninsula, and 75% of barns and warehouses were either severely damaged or destroyed. Damage to crops and livestock was extreme; 2,000 square kilometres of maize and 400 square kilometres of fruit trees were damaged across the country. A total of 70% of the poultry production and livestock were lost during the storm in Yucatán. Damage to Mexico's power grid reached US$19.76 million. Over one-fourth of the roads across the peninsula were moderately or severely damaged, which resulted in losses of US$9.88 million to rural areas. Farming in Campeche experienced significant damage, with 30,000 cattle and 100,000 acres (400 km^{2}) of agricultural land lost.

Throughout the Yucatán Peninsula, there were 17 deaths were attributed to Hurricane Isidore, two of which were indirectly related to the storm. Damage in the country totaled $950 million (2002 USD).

=== Central America ===
Isidore caused heavy rains in Guatemala due to upslope flow from the Pacific Ocean, which led to landslides and flooding across southern and western portions of the country. The rains led to the drowning of two people when they tried to cross a rain-swollen river. Three hundred and fifty households reported losses.

=== Eastern United States ===
In the open Gulf of Mexico, Hurricane Isidore and later Hurricane Lili contributed to the shutdown of offshore oil and gas platforms. The effects of back-to-back storms resulted in the loss of production of 14.4 million barrels (2,290,000 m^{3}) of oil and 88.9 billion cubic feet (2.52×10^{9} m^{3}) of natural gas. A storm surge of 8.3 feet (2.5 m) was measured at Rigoletes, Louisiana and at Gulfport Harbor, Mississippi. Hurricane Isidore brought widespread heavy rainfall from the central Gulf coast into the Ohio Valley, with a maximum of 15.97 inches (406 mm) at Metairie, Louisiana. The flooding was responsible for moderate crop damage, with a total of $330 million in damage (2002 USD). Isidore claimed five lives in the U.S.: four direct and one indirect. The indirect death was from a man that went into cardiac arrest in Mississippi, whereas the other four were drowning deaths.

== Retirement ==
On account of the widespread flooding and heavy damage caused by the hurricane, the World Meteorological Organization retired name Isidore in the spring of 2003, and it will never again be used for a North Atlantic tropical cyclone. It was replaced with Ike for the 2008 season.

== See also ==
- Tropical cyclones in 2002
- Timeline of the 2002 Atlantic hurricane season
- List of Category 3 Atlantic hurricanes
- List of Cuba hurricanes
- List of wettest tropical cyclones in the United States
- List of wettest tropical cyclones in Jamaica
- List of Florida hurricanes (2000–present)
- List of North Carolina hurricanes (2000–present)
- Tropical Storm Cristobal (2020)
