= List of storms named Kyle =

The name Kyle has been used for four tropical cyclones in the Atlantic Ocean since 1996, the year in which Kyle replaced Klaus on the rotating six-year cycle of names used in the North Atlantic basin.

- Tropical Storm Kyle (1996) – formed in the western Caribbean and made landfall over Guatemala and Honduras as a weakening storm, causing no significant damage.
- Hurricane Kyle (2002) – long-lived hurricane, bobbed in and out of the Carolinas, causing $5 million damage, mostly from tornadoes.
- Hurricane Kyle (2008) – formed north of Hispaniola and made landfall in Nova Scotia as a minimal hurricane.
- Tropical Storm Kyle (2020) – earliest eleventh named storm on record, formed off the coast of New Jersey and dissipated out in the ocean.

The name Kyle has also been used for two tropical cyclones in the Western Pacific Ocean.

- Typhoon Kyle (1990) (T9023, 25W)
- Typhoon Kyle (1993) (T9325, 34W, Luring) – struck the Philippines and Vietnam.
