= Timeline of the 2002 Atlantic hurricane season =

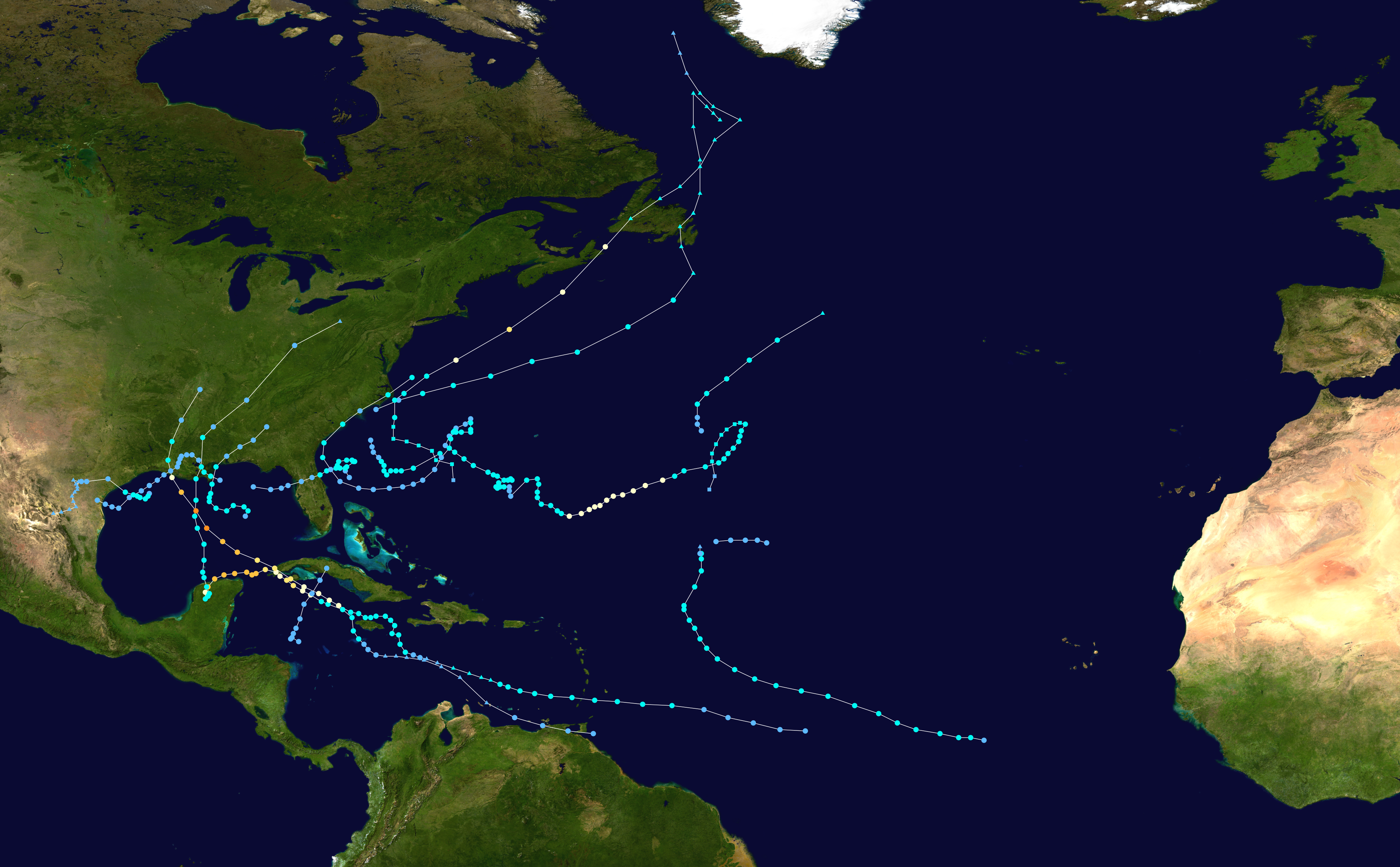
- Season summary map

Season boundaries
- First system formed: July 14, 2002
- Last system dissipated: October 16, 2002

Strongest system
- By maximum sustained winds: Lili
  - Maximum winds: 145 mph (230 km/h) (1-minute sustained)
  - Lowest pressure: 938 mbar (hPa; 27.7 inHg)
- By central pressure: Isidore
  - Maximum winds: 125 mph (205 km/h) (1-minute sustained)
  - Lowest pressure: 934 mbar (hPa; 27.58 inHg)

Longest lasting system
- Name: Kyle
- Duration: 22 days
Storm articles
- Tropical Storm Bertha (2002)
- Tropical Storm Edouard (2002)
- Tropical Storm Fay (2002)
- Hurricane Gustav (2002)
- Tropical Storm Hanna (2002)
- Hurricane Isidore
- Hurricane Kyle (2002)
- Hurricane Lili

The 2002 Atlantic hurricane season was an average Atlantic hurricane season in which twelve named storms formed. (Note: An average season, as defined by the National Oceanic and Atmospheric Administration, has twelve tropical storms, six hurricanes and two major hurricanes.) Although Tropical Storm Arthur formed on July 14, the season officially began on June 1 and ended on November 30, dates that conventionally delimit the period of each year when most tropical cyclones develop in the Atlantic basin. The season's final storm, Tropical Depression Fourteen, dissipated on October 16.

The season produced fourteen tropical depressions, of which twelve intensified into tropical storms, four became hurricanes, and two became major hurricanes. (Note: A major hurricane is a storm that ranks as Category 3 or higher on the Saffir–Simpson Hurricane scale.) The two most significant storms of the season, in terms of loss of life and damage, were hurricanes Isidore and Lili. Hurricane Isidore was an unusually large storm and attained maximum sustained winds of 125 mph (205 km/h), becoming one of only two major hurricanes during the season. Hurricane Lili was the strongest hurricane during the season, with winds reaching 145 mph (230 km/h) before moving ashore Louisiana as a much weaker system.

This timeline documents tropical cyclone formations, strengthening, weakening, landfalls, extratropical transitions, and dissipations during the season. It includes information that was not released throughout the season, meaning that data from post-storm reviews by the National Hurricane Center, such as a storm that was not initially warned upon, has been included.

The time stamp for each event is first stated using Coordinated Universal Time (UTC), the 24-hour clock where 00:00 = midnight UTC. The NHC uses both UTC and the time zone where the center of the tropical cyclone is currently located. The time zones utilized (east to west) prior to 2020 were: Atlantic, Eastern, and Central. In this timeline, the respective area time is included in parentheses. Additionally, figures for maximum sustained winds and position estimates are rounded to the nearest 5 units (miles, or kilometers), following National Hurricane Center practice. Direct wind observations are rounded to the nearest whole number. Atmospheric pressures are listed to the nearest millibar and nearest hundredth of an inch of mercury.

== Timeline ==
=== June ===
June 1

- The 2002 Atlantic hurricane season officially begins.

=== July ===
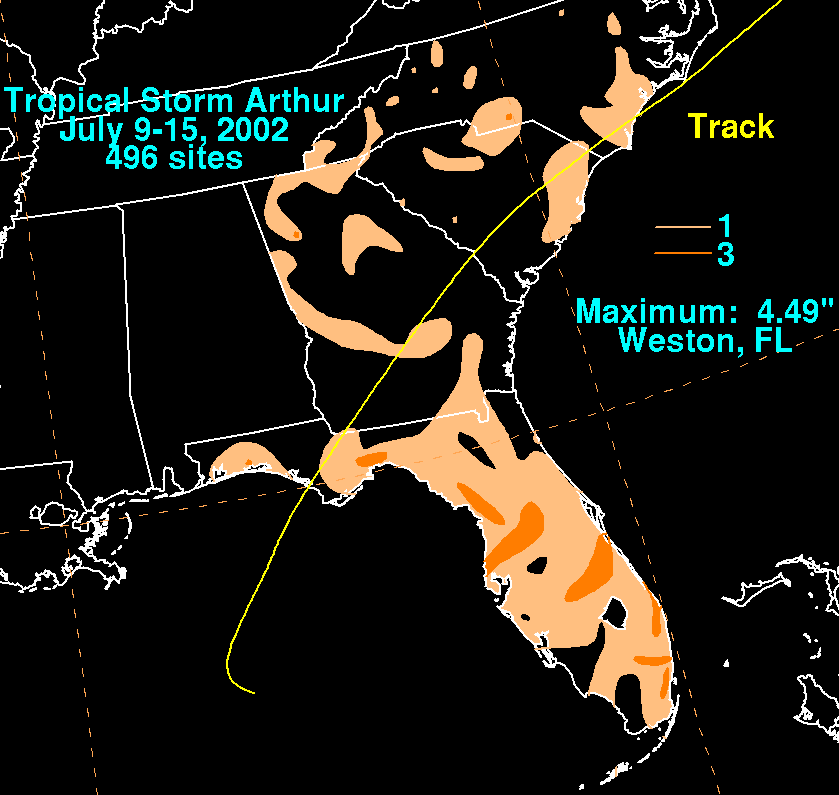
Rainfall totals from Tropical Storm Arthur in the Southeastern United States

July 14

- 1800 UTC (2:00 p.m. EDT) – Tropical Depression One develops from an area of low pressure roughly 40 mi (65 km) (Note: The figures for maximum sustained winds and position estimates are rounded to the nearest 5 units (knots, miles, or kilometers), following the convention used in the National Hurricane Center's operational products for each storm. All other units are rounded to the nearest digit.) west-southwest of Hatteras, North Carolina.

July 15

- 0600 UTC (2:00 a.m. EDT) – Tropical Depression One intensifies into Tropical Storm Arthur.

July 16

- 1800 UTC (2:00 p.m. EDT) – Tropical Storm Arthur reaches its peak intensity with winds of 60 mph (95 km/h) and a minimum barometric pressure of 997 mbar (hPa; 29.44 inHg) roughly 350 mi (560 km) south of Nova Scotia.

July 17

- 0000 UTC (8:00 p.m. EDT July 16) – Tropical Storm Arthur transitions into an extratropical cyclone south of Newfoundland.

=== August ===
August 4

- 1800 UTC (1:00 p.m. CDT) – Tropical Depression Two develops from an area of low pressure east of Louisiana.

August 5

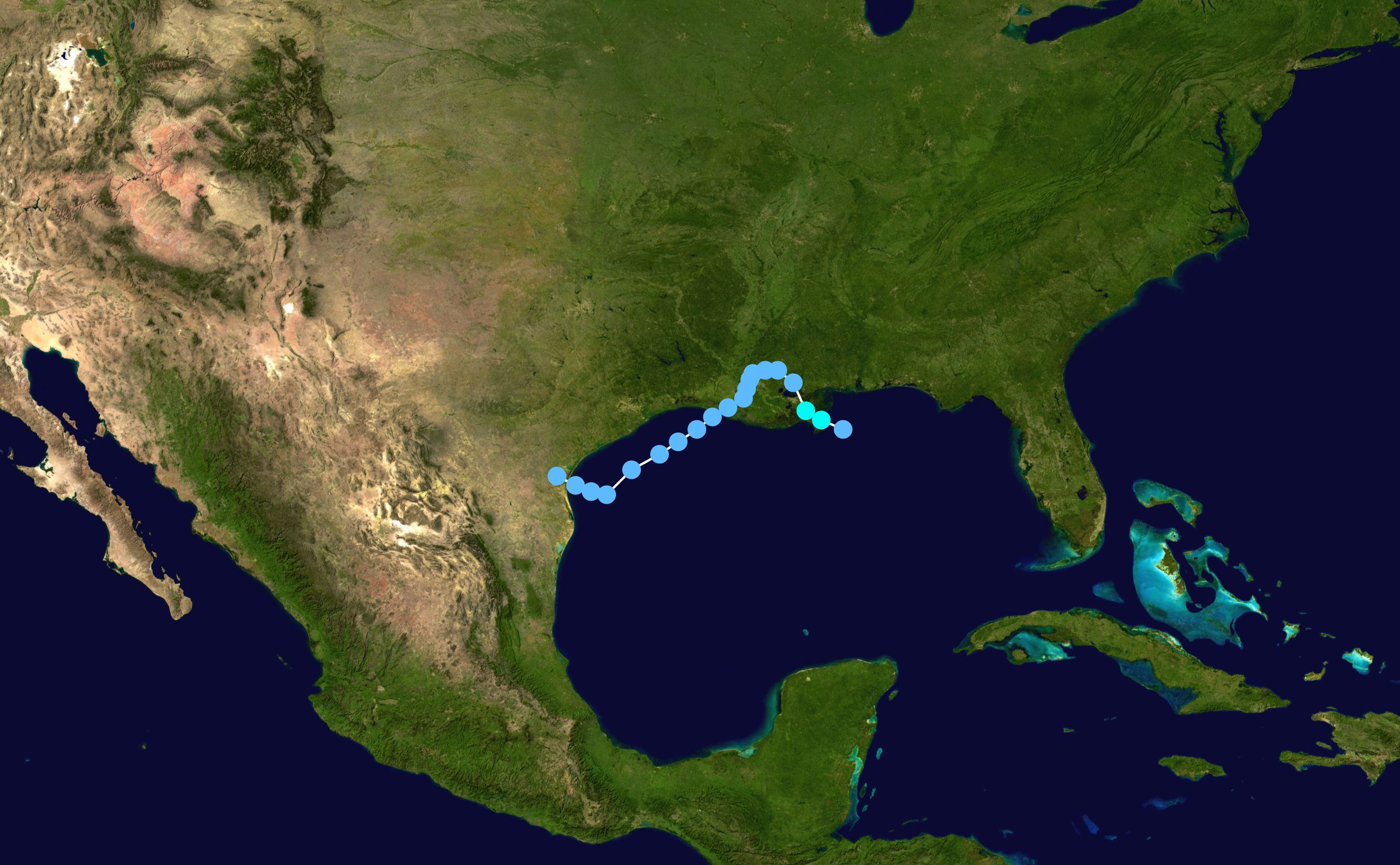
Storm path of Tropical Storm Bertha

- 0000 UTC (7:00 p.m. CDT August 4) – Tropical Depression Two intensifies into Tropical Storm Bertha.
- 0100 UTC (8:00 p.m. CDT August 4) – Tropical Storm Bertha reaches its peak intensity with winds of 40 mph (65 km/h) and a minimum barometric pressure of 1007 mbar (hPa; 29.74 inHg).
- 0200 UTC (9:00 p.m. CDT August 4) – Tropical Storm Bertha makes its first landfall near Boothville, Louisiana, with winds of 40 mph (65 km/h).
- 1200 UTC (7:00 a.m. CDT) – Tropical Storm Bertha weakens to a tropical depression over southeastern Louisiana.
- 1800 UTC (2:00 p.m. EDT) – Tropical Depression Three develops from an area of low pressure roughly 150 mi (240 km) east-southeast of Charleston, South Carolina.

August 6

- 1800 UTC (2:00 p.m. EDT) – Tropical Depression Three intensifies into Tropical Storm Cristobal.

August 7

- 0000 UTC (8:00 p.m. EDT August 6) – Tropical Storm Cristobal reaches its peak intensity with a minimum barometric pressure of 999 mbar (hPa; 29.5 inHg).

August 8

Tropical Storm Cristobal on August 7, 2002

- 0600 UTC (2:00 a.m. EDT) – Tropical Storm Cristobal reaches its peak intensity with winds of 50 mph (85 km/h).

August 9

- 0000 UTC (8:00 p.m. EDT) – Tropical Storm Cristobal is absorbed into a frontal zone roughly 300 mi (480 km) southeast of Cape Hatteras, North Carolina.
- 0800 UTC (3:00 a.m. CDT) – Tropical Depression Bertha makes its second and final landfall near Griffins Point, Texas, with winds of 25 mph (40 km/h).
- 1800 UTC (1:00 p.m. CDT) – Tropical Depression Bertha dissipates over southeastern Texas.

August 29

- 1200 UTC (8:00 a.m. AST) – Tropical Depression Four develops from an area of low pressure roughly 550 mi (890 km) southwest of the westernmost Cape Verde Islands.
- 1800 UTC (2:00 p.m. AST) – Tropical Depression Four intensifies into Tropical Storm Dolly.

August 30

- 1200 UTC (8:00 a.m. AST) – Tropical Storm Dolly reaches its peak intensity with winds of 60 mph (95 km/h) and a minimum barometric pressure of 997 mbar (hPa; 29.44 inHg).

=== September ===
September 1

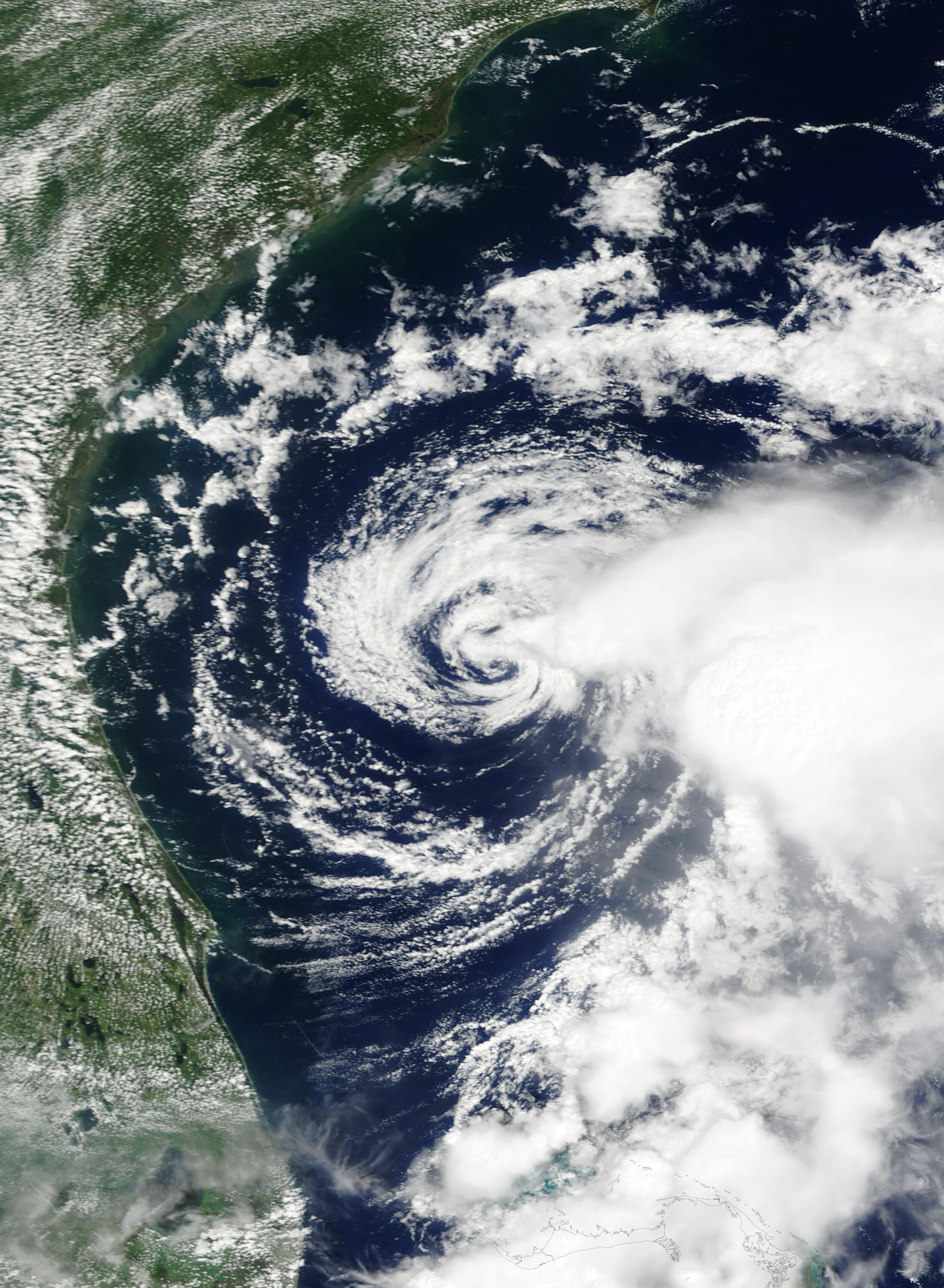
Tropical Storm Edouard near peak intensity on September 3, 2002

- 1800 UTC (2:00 p.m. EDT) – Tropical Depression Five develops from an area of low pressure roughly 120 mi (195 km) east of Daytona Beach, Florida.

September 2

- 0600 UTC (2:00 a.m. EDT) – Tropical Depression Five intensifies into Tropical Storm Edouard.

September 3

- 1200 UTC (8:00 a.m. EDT) – Tropical Storm Edouard reaches its peak intensity with winds of 65 mph (100 km/h) and a minimum barometric pressure of 1002 mbar (hPa; 29.59 inHg).

September 4

- 1200 UTC (8:00 a.m. AST) – Tropical Storm Dolly weakens to a tropical depression.
- 1800 UTC (2:00 p.m. AST) – Tropical Depression Dolly degenerates into a non-convective remnant low-pressure area.

September 5

- 0045 UTC (8:45 p.m. EDT September 4) – Tropical Storm Edouard makes landfall near Ormond Beach, Florida, with winds of 40 mph (65 km/h).
- 0600 UTC (2:00 a.m. EDT) – Tropical Storm Edouard weakens to a tropical depression over Florida.
- 1800 UTC (1:00 p.m. CDT) – Tropical Depression Six develops from an area of low pressure roughly 85 mi (140 mi) southeast of Galveston, Texas.

September 6

- 0000 UTC (7:00 p.m. CDT September 5) – Tropical Depression Six intensifies into Tropical Storm Fay roughly 110 mi (175 km) southeast of Galveston, Texas.
- 1800 UTC (2:00 p.m. EDT) – Tropical Depression Edouard dissipates south of the Florida Panhandle.

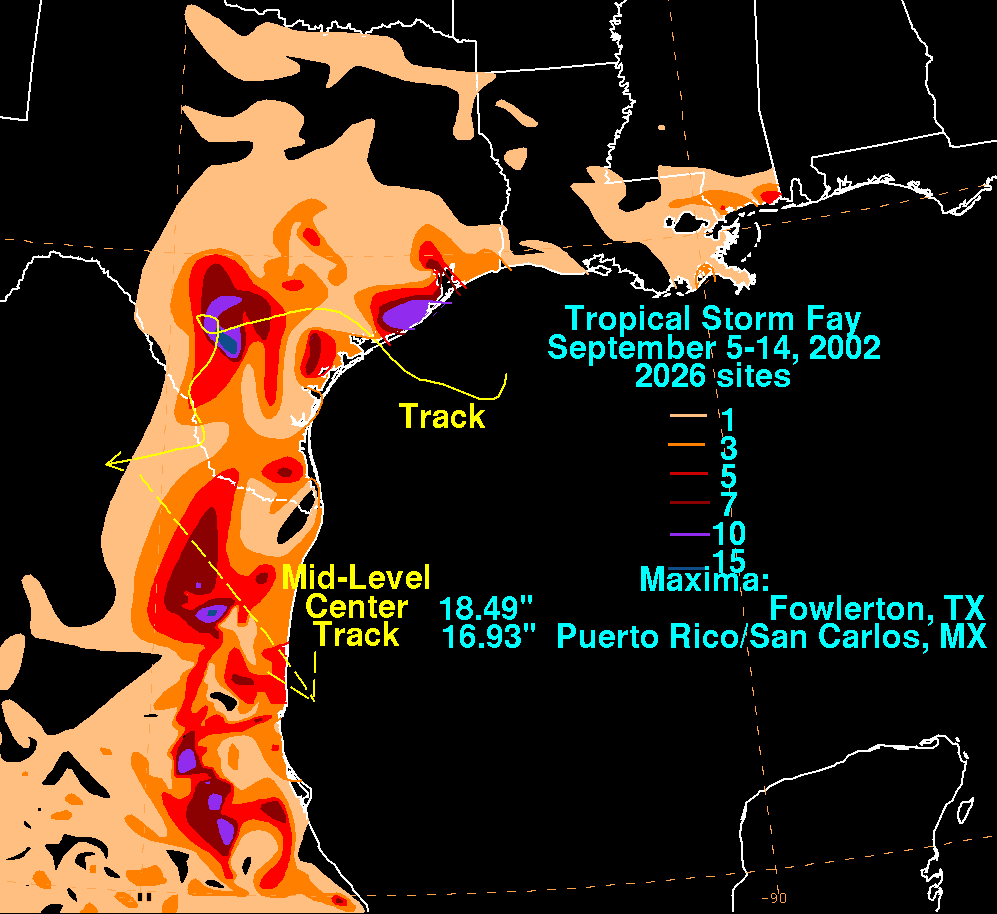
Rainfall totals from Tropical Storm Fay across Texas and Mexico

September 7

- 0000 UTC (7:00 p.m. CDT September 6) – Tropical Storm Fay reaches its peak intensity with winds of 60 mph (95 km/h) and a minimum barometric pressure of 998 mbar (hPa; 29.47 inHg) roughly 125 mi (205 km) southeast of Galveston, Texas.
- 0900 UTC (4:00 a.m. CDT) – Tropical Storm Fay makes landfall roughly 10 mi (15 km) east of Port O'Connor, Texas, with winds of 60 mph (95 km/h).
- 1200 UTC (7:00 a.m. CDT) – Tropical Storm Fay weakens to a tropical depression.
- 1200 UTC (8:00 a.m. AST) – Tropical Depression Seven develops from an area of low pressure roughly 1155 mi (1855 km) east-southeast of Bermuda. Concurrently, the tropical depression also reaches its peak intensity with winds of 35 mph (55 km/h) and a minimum barometric pressure of 1013 mbar (hPa; 29.9 inHg).

September 8

- 0600 UTC (1:00 a.m. CDT) – Tropical Depression Fay degenerates into a non-convective remnant area of low pressure over the mountainous terrain of Mexico.
- 1200 UTC (8:00 a.m. EDT) – Subtropical Depression Eight develops from an area of low pressure roughly 440 mi (710 km) south-southeast of Cape Hatteras, North Carolina.
- 1800 UTC (2:00 p.m. AST) – Tropical Depression Seven dissipates roughly 850 mi (1370 km) southeast of Bermuda.
- 1800 UTC (2:00 p.m. EDT) – Subtropical Depression Eight intensifies into Subtropical Storm Gustav, becoming the first subtropical storm to be assigned a name.

September 10

- 1200 UTC (8:00 a.m. EDT) – Subtropical Storm Gustav transitions into a tropical storm and is designated as Tropical Storm Gustav.

September 11

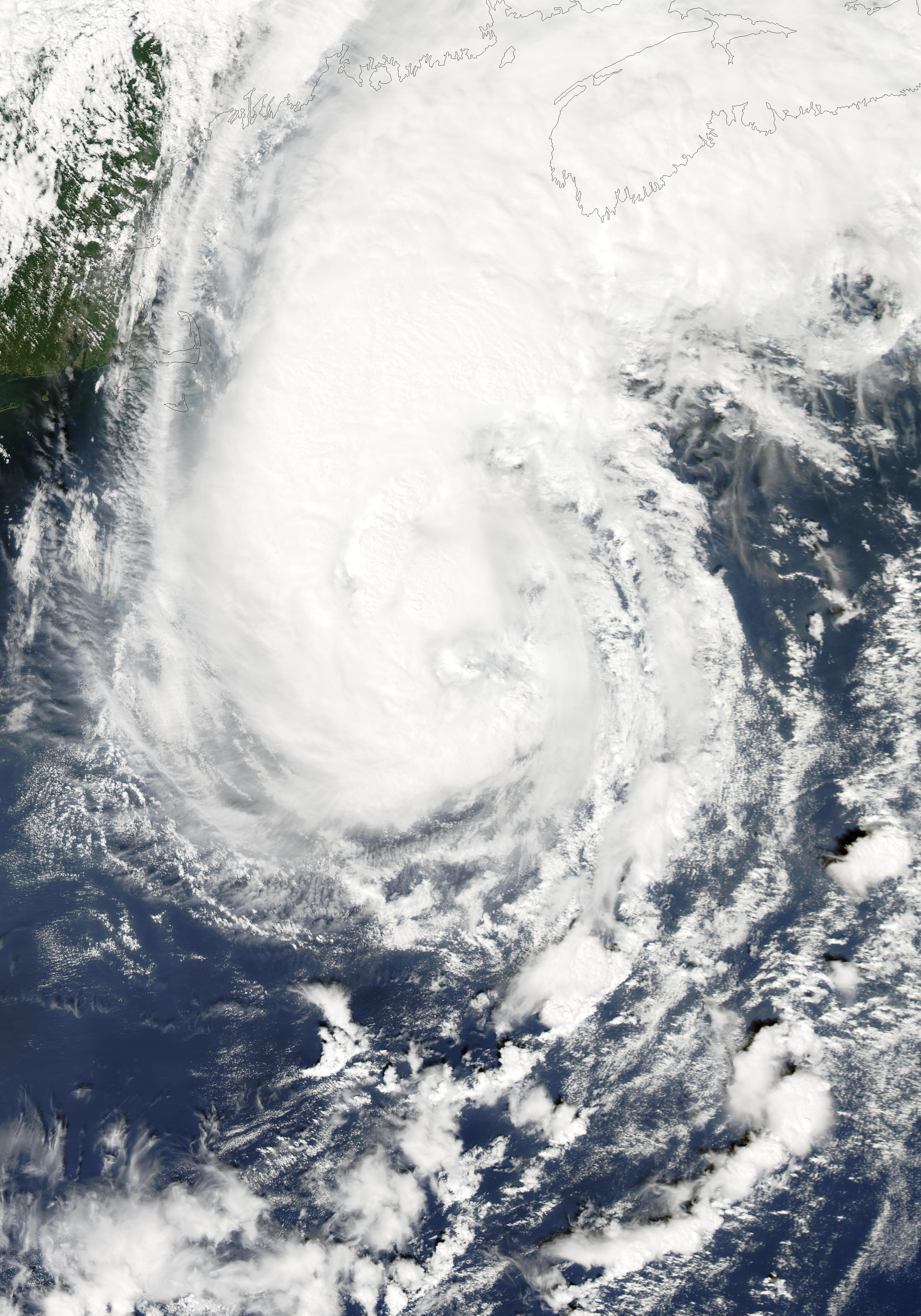
Satellite imagery of Hurricane Gustav near peak intensity as a Category 2 hurricane on September 11, 2002

- 1200 UTC (8:00 a.m. EDT) – Tropical Storm Gustav intensifies into a Category 1 hurricane on the Saffir–Simpson Hurricane Scale, becoming the first hurricane of the 2002 season.
- 1800 UTC (2:00 p.m. EDT) – Hurricane Gustav intensifies into a Category 2 hurricane and reaches its peak intensity with winds of 100 mph (155 km/h).

September 12

- 0000 UTC (8:00 p.m. EDT September 11) – Hurricane Gustav weakens to a Category 1 hurricane.
- 0000 UTC (7:00 p.m. CDT September 11) – Tropical Depression Nine develops from an area of low pressure roughly 250 mi (400 km) south of Pensacola, Florida.
- 0400 UTC (12:00 a.m. EDT) – Hurricane Gustav reaches its peak intensity with a minimum barometric pressure of 960 mbar (hPa; 28.35 inHg).
- 0430 UTC (12:30 a.m. AST) – Hurricane Gustav makes its first landfall on Cape Breton Island with winds of 80 mph (130 km/h).
- 0600 UTC (1:00 a.m. CDT) – Tropical Depression Nine intensifies into Tropical Storm Hanna roughly 225 mi (360 km) south of Pensacola, Florida.
- 0900 UTC (5:00 a.m. AST) – Hurricane Gustav makes its second and final landfall near Rose Blanche – Harbour le Cou, Newfoundland, with winds of 75 mph (120 km/h).
- 1200 UTC (8:00 a.m. AST) – Hurricane Gustav transitions into an extratropical cyclone over Newfoundland.

September 14

- 0000 UTC (7:00 p.m. CDT September 13) – Tropical Storm Hanna reaches its peak intensity with winds of 60 mph (95 km/h) and a minimum barometric pressure of 1001 mbar (hPa; 29.56 inHg) roughly 60 mi (95 km) south of the mouth of the Mississippi River.
- 0800 UTC (3:00 a.m. CDT) – Tropical Storm Hanna makes its first landfall near the mouth of the Mississippi River with winds of 60 mph (95 km/h).
- 1500 UTC (10:00 a.m. CDT) – Tropical Storm Hanna makes its second and final landfall near the Alabama–Mississippi border with winds of 60 mph (95 km/h).
- 1800 UTC (1:00 p.m. CDT) – Tropical Storm Hanna weakens to a tropical depression.
- 1800 UTC (2:00 p.m. EDT) – Tropical Depression Ten develops from an area of low pressure near Trinidad and Tobago.

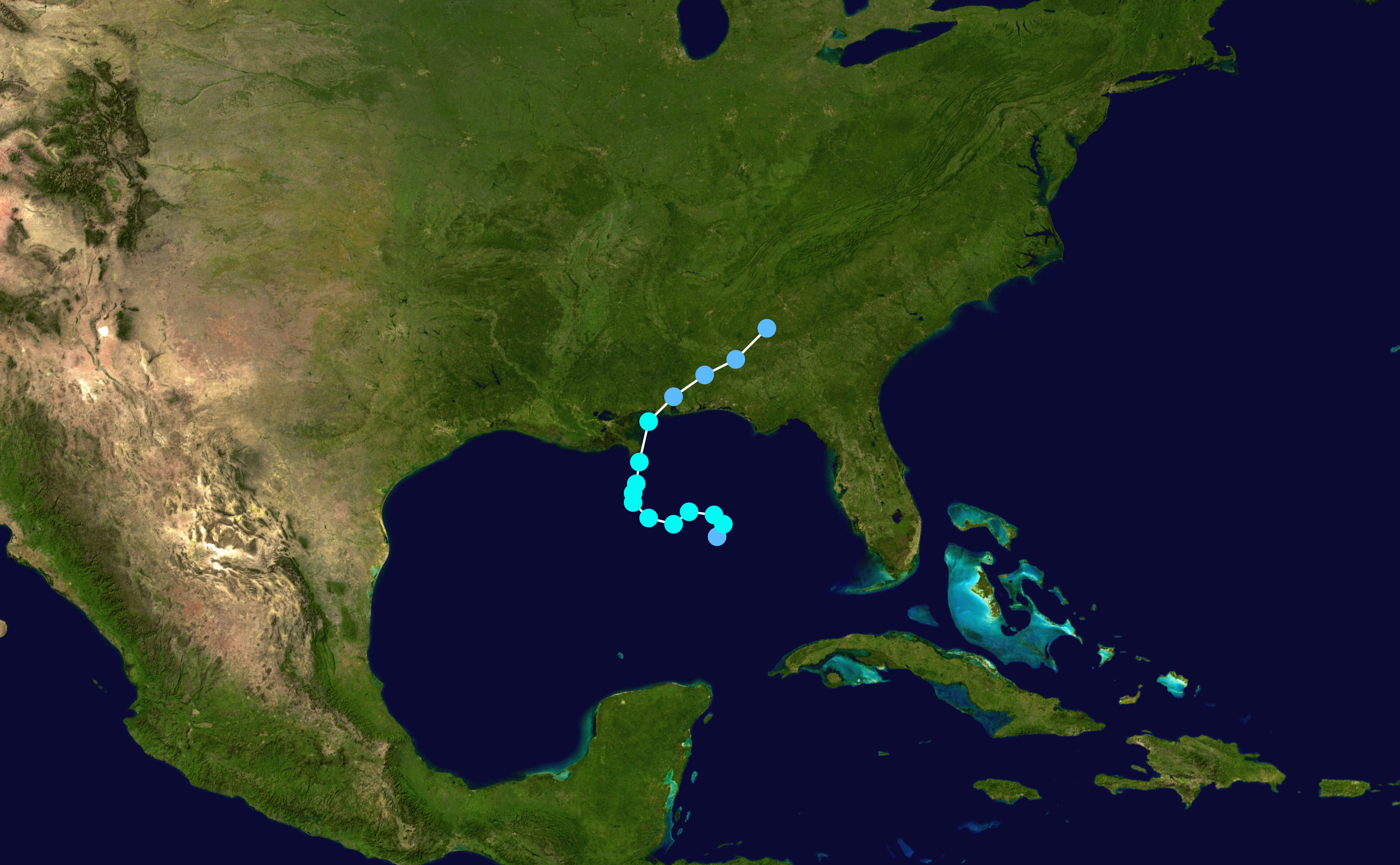
Storm path of Tropical Storm Hanna

September 15

- 1800 UTC (2:00 p.m. EDT) – Tropical Depression Hanna dissipates over Alabama.
- 1800 UTC (2:00 p.m. EDT) – Tropical Depression Ten degenerates into a tropical wave in the eastern Caribbean.

September 17

- 1200 UTC (8:00 a.m. EDT) – Tropical Depression Ten regains tropical depression status roughly 120 mi (195 km) south of Kingston, Jamaica.
- 1200 UTC (8:00 a.m. AST) – Tropical Depression Eleven develops from an area of low pressure roughly 620 mi (1000 km) east of Bermuda.

September 18

- 0600 UTC (2:00 a.m. EDT) – Tropical Depression Ten intensifies into Tropical Storm Isidore.
- 0600 UTC (2:00 a.m. AST) – Tropical Depression Eleven intensifies into Tropical Storm Josephine.

September 19

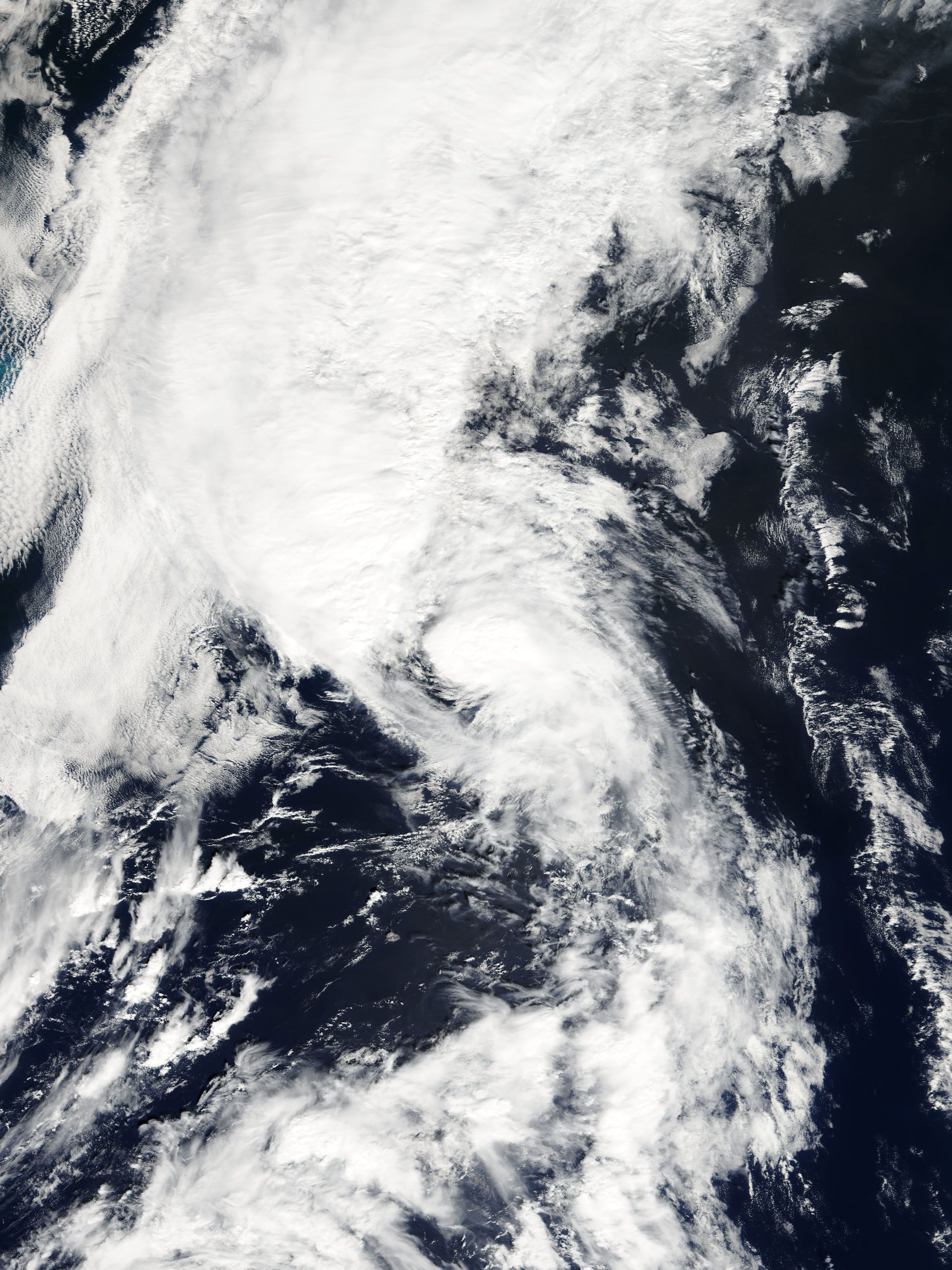
Satellite imagery of Tropical Storm Josephine on September 19, 2002

- 0600 UTC (2:00 a.m. AST) – Tropical Storm Josephine reaches its peak intensity with winds of 40 mph (65 km/h) and a minimum barometric pressure of 1009 mbar (hPa; 29.81 inHg).
- 1200 UTC (8:00 a.m. AST) – Tropical Storm Josephine transitions into an extratropical cyclone.
- 1800 UTC (2:00 p.m. EDT) – Tropical Storm Isidore intensifies into a Category 1 hurricane.
- 1800 UTC (2:00 p.m. AST) – The extratropical remnants of Josephine merge with a larger extratropical cyclone.

September 20

- 0600 UTC (2:00 a.m. EDT) – Hurricane Isidore intensifies into a Category 2 hurricane.
- 1800 UTC (2:00 p.m. EDT) – Hurricane Isidore weakens to a Category 1 hurricane.
- 1800 UTC (2:00 p.m. AST) – Subtropical Depression Twelve develops from an area of low pressure roughly 715 mi (1150 km) east-southeast of Bermuda.
- 2100 UTC (5:00 p.m. EDT) – Hurricane Isidore makes landfall at Cabo Frances, Cuba, with winds of 85 mph (140 km/h).

September 21

- 0600 UTC (2:00 a.m. EDT) – Hurricane Isidore regains Category 2 hurricane status.
- 0600 UTC (2:00 p.m. AST) – Subtropical Depression Twelve intensifies into Subtropical Storm Kyle roughly 680 mi (1090 km) east of Bermuda.
- 1200 UTC (7:00 a.m. CDT) – Hurricane Isidore intensifies into a Category 3 hurricane, the first major hurricane of the season.
- 1800 UTC (2:00 p.m. AST) – Tropical Depression Thirteen develops from an area of low pressure roughly 900 mi (1400 km) east of the Windward Islands.

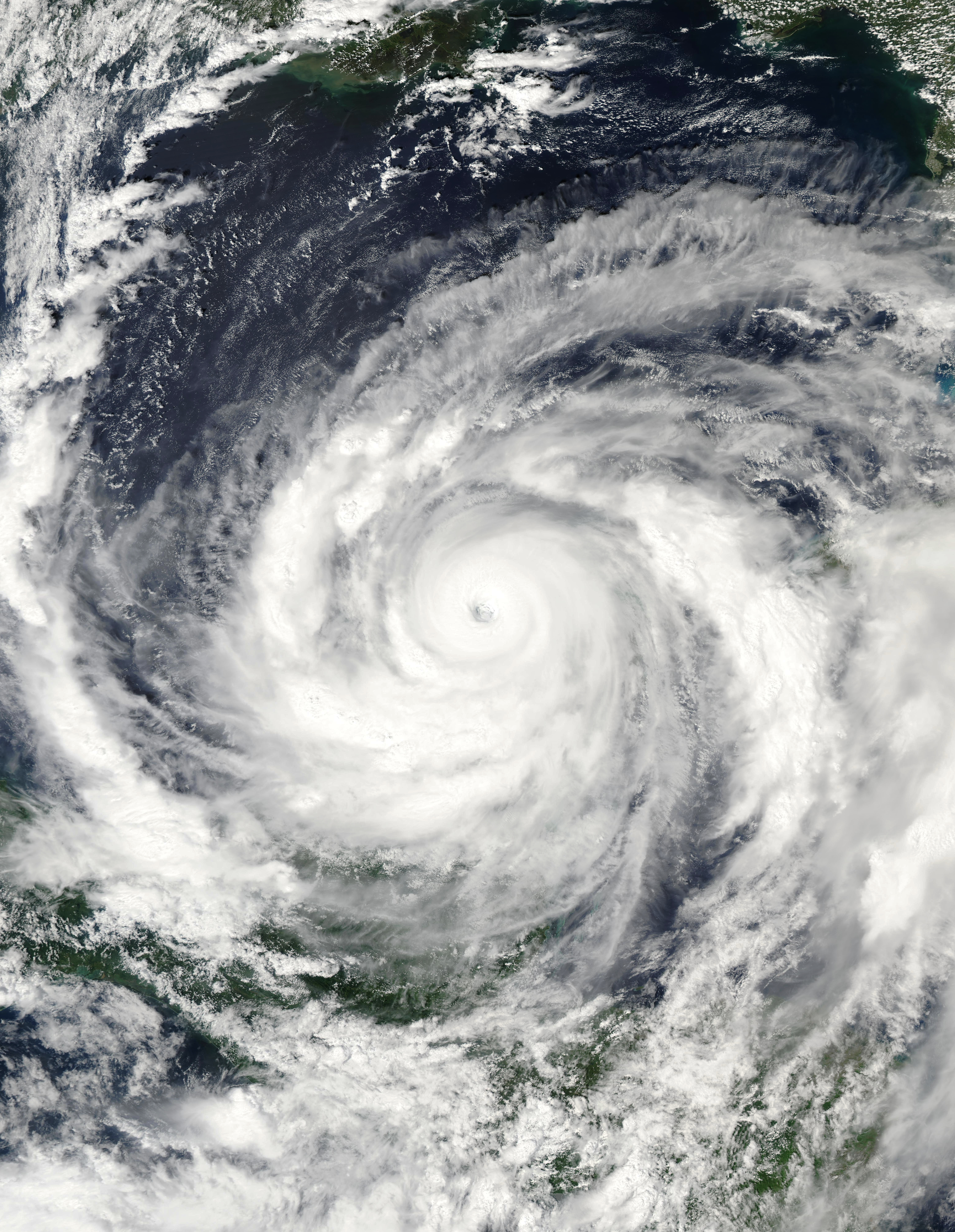
Hurricane Isidore near peak intensity as a Category 3 hurricane on September 22, 2002

September 22

- 1200 UTC (7:00 a.m. CDT) – Hurricane Isidore reaches its peak intensity with winds of 125 mph (205 km/h) and a minimum barometric pressure of 934 mbar (hPa; 27.58 inHg).
- 2100 UTC (4:00 p.m. CDT) – Hurricane Isidore makes landfall at Telchac Puerto, Yucatán, with winds of 125 mph (205 km/h).

September 23

- 0000 UTC (8:00 p.m. AST) – Subtropical Storm Kyle transitions into a tropical storm and is designated as Tropical Storm Kyle roughly 760 mi (1220 km) east of Bermuda.
- 0000 UTC (8:00 p.m. EDT September 22) – Tropical Depression Thirteen intensifies into Tropical Storm Lili.
- 0600 UTC (1:00 a.m. CDT) – Hurricane Isidore weakens to a Category 1 hurricane.
- 1200 UTC (7:00 a.m. CDT) – Hurricane Isidore weakens to a tropical storm over the Yucatán Peninsula.

September 25

- 1200 UTC (8:00 a.m. AST) – Tropical Storm Kyle intensifies into a Category 1 hurricane.
- 1200 UTC (8:00 a.m. EDT) – Tropical Storm Lili degenerates into a tropical wave.

September 26

- 0600 UTC (1:00 a.m. CDT) – Tropical Storm Isidore makes landfall just west of Grand Isle, Louisiana, with winds of 65 mph (100 km/h).

September 27

- 0000 UTC (7:00 p.m. CDT September 26) – Tropical Storm Isidore weakens to a tropical depression.
- 0000 UTC (8:00 p.m. AST September 26) – Hurricane Kyle reaches its peak intensity with winds of 85 mph (140 km/h) and a minimum barometric pressure of 980 mbar (hPa; 28.94 inHg).
- 0000 UTC (8:00 p.m. EDT September 26) – The remnants of Tropical Storm Lili regenerate into Tropical Depression Lili.
- 1200 UTC (8:00 a.m. EDT) – Tropical Depression Lili regains tropical storm status.
- 1800 UTC (1:00 p.m. CDT) – Tropical Depression Isidore transitions into an extratropical cyclone over southwestern Pennsylvania.

September 28

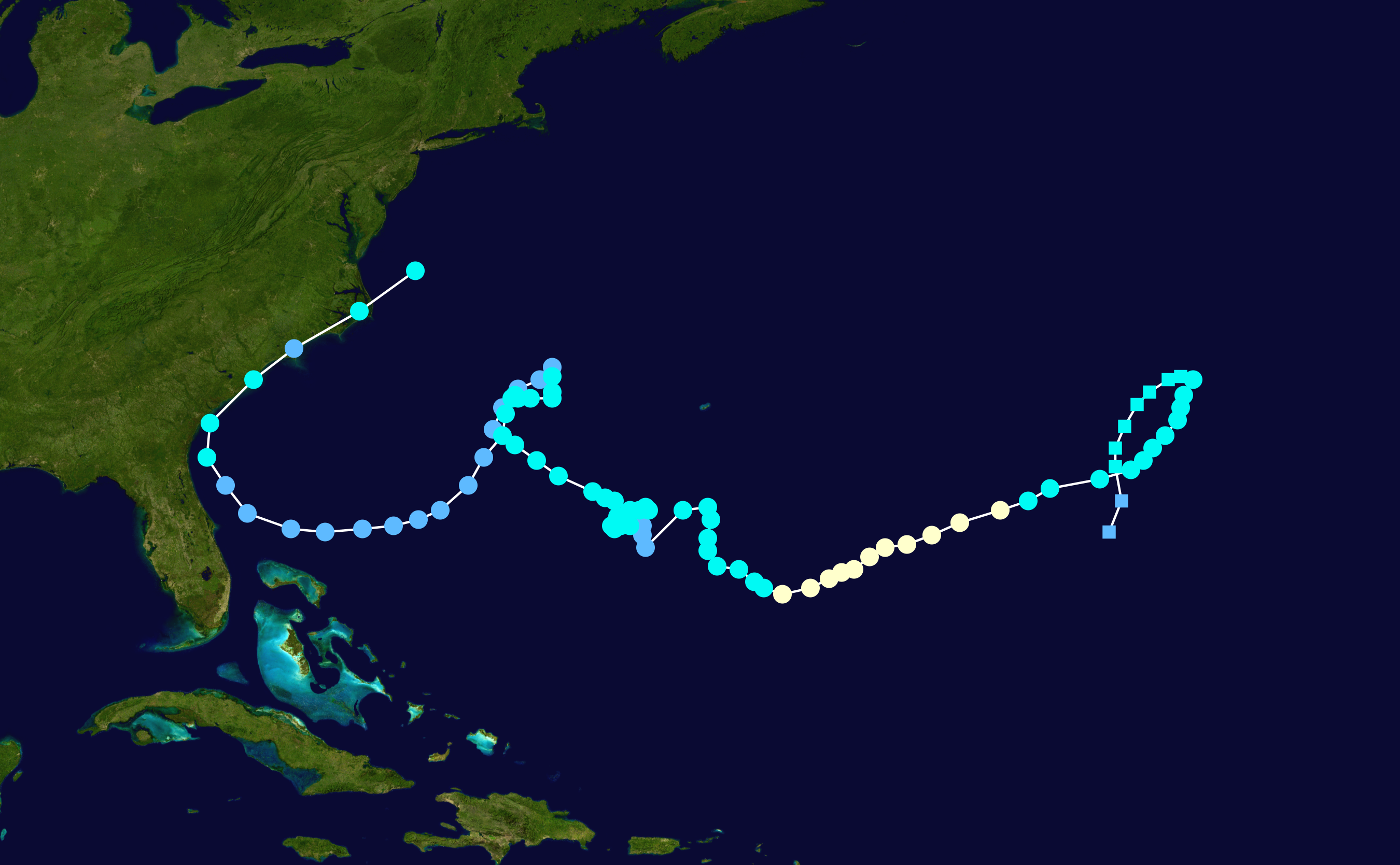
Storm path of Hurricane Kyle

- 1200 UTC (8:00 a.m. AST) – Hurricane Kyle weakens to a tropical storm.

September 30

- 1200 UTC (8:00 a.m. EDT) – Tropical Storm Lili intensifies into a Category 1 hurricane.
- 1400 UTC (10:00 a.m. EDT) – Hurricane Lili makes a first landfall on Cayman Brac and Little Cayman, Cayman Islands, with winds of 75 mph (120 km/h).
- 1800 UTC (2:00 p.m. AST) – Tropical Storm Kyle weakens to a tropical depression.

=== October ===
October 1

- 1100 UTC (7:00 a.m. EDT) – Hurricane Lili intensifies into a Category 2 hurricane and makes a second landfall on the coast of the Isle of Youth, Cuba, with winds of 105 mph (165 km/h).
- 1200 UTC (8:00 a.m. AST) – Tropical Depression Kyle regains tropical storm status.
- 1400 UTC (10:00 a.m. EDT) – Hurricane Lili makes a third landfall near Pinar del Río Province, Cuba, with winds of 105 mph (165 km/h).

October 2

Hurricane Lili near peak intensity as the strongest hurricane of the 2002 season on October 2, 2002

- 0600 UTC (2:00 a.m. EDT) – Hurricane Lili intensifies into a Category 3 hurricane.
- 1800 UTC (1:00 p.m. CDT) – Hurricane Lili intensifies into a Category 4 hurricane.
- 2013 UTC (3:13 p.m. CDT) – Hurricane Lili reaches its peak intensity with winds of 145 mph (230 km/h) and a minimum barometric pressure of 938 mbar (hPa; 27.7 inHg).

October 3

- 0600 UTC (1:00 a.m. CDT) – Hurricane Lili weakens to a Category 3 hurricane.
- 1200 UTC (7:00 a.m. CDT) – Hurricane Lili weakens to a Category 1 hurricane.
- 1300 UTC (8:00 a.m. CDT) – Hurricane Lili makes a fourth and final landfall near Intracoastal City, Louisiana, with winds of 90 mph (150 km/h).
- 1800 UTC (1:00 p.m. CDT) – Hurricane Lili weakens to a tropical storm.

October 4

- 0600 UTC (1:00 a.m. CDT) – Tropical Storm Lili weakens to a tropical depression.
- 1800 UTC (1:00 p.m. CDT) – Tropical Depression Lili becomes absorbed within a larger extratropical area of low pressure near the Tennessee–Arkansas border.

October 5

- 0600 UTC (2:00 a.m. AST) – Tropical Storm Kyle weakens to a tropical depression.

October 6

- 1200 UTC (8:00 a.m. AST) – Tropical Depression Kyle regains tropical storm status.

October 8

- 1800 UTC (2:00 p.m. EDT) – Tropical Storm Kyle weakens to a tropical depression.

October 11

- 0600 UTC (2:00 a.m. EDT) – Tropical Depression Kyle regains tropical storm status.
- 1700 UTC (1:00 p.m. EDT) – Tropical Storm Kyle makes its first landfall near McClellanville, South Carolina, with winds of 40 mph (65 km/h).
- 2200 UTC (6:00 p.m. EDT) – Tropical Storm Kyle makes its second and final landfall near Long Beach, North Carolina, with winds of 40 mph (65 km/h).

October 12

- 0000 UTC (8:00 p.m. EDT October 11) – Tropical Storm Kyle weakens to a tropical depression near Surf City, North Carolina.
- 0600 UTC (2:00 a.m. EDT) – Tropical Depression Kyle regains tropical storm status over Pamlico Sound, North Carolina.
- 1800 UTC (2:00 p.m. EDT) – Tropical Storm Kyle merges with a cold front roughly 280 mi (450 km) south-southwest of Nantucket, Massachusetts, making it the third longest-lived Atlantic tropical cyclone in recorded history.

Tropical Depression Fourteen while located over Cuba on October 15, 2002

October 14

- 1200 UTC (8:00 a.m. EDT) – Tropical Depression Fourteen develops from an area of low pressure roughly 120 mi (195 km) north-northeast of Cabo Gracias a Dios.

October 15

- 1800 UTC (2:00 p.m. EDT) – Tropical Depression Fourteen reaches its peak intensity with winds of 35 mph (55 km/h) and a minimum barometric pressure of 1002 mbar (hPa; 29.59 inHg).

October 16

- 1600 UTC (12:00 p.m. EDT) – Tropical Depression Fourteen makes landfall near Cienfuegos, Cuba, with winds of 30 mph (45 km/h).

October 17

- 0000 UTC (8:00 p.m. EDT October 16) – Tropical Depression Fourteen is absorbed by a cold front over Cuba.

=== November ===
November 30

- The 2002 Atlantic hurricane season officially ends.

== See also ==
- Lists of Atlantic hurricanes
- Timeline of the 2002 Pacific hurricane season
