= Hurricane Kyle (2002) =

Category 1 Atlantic hurricane in 2002

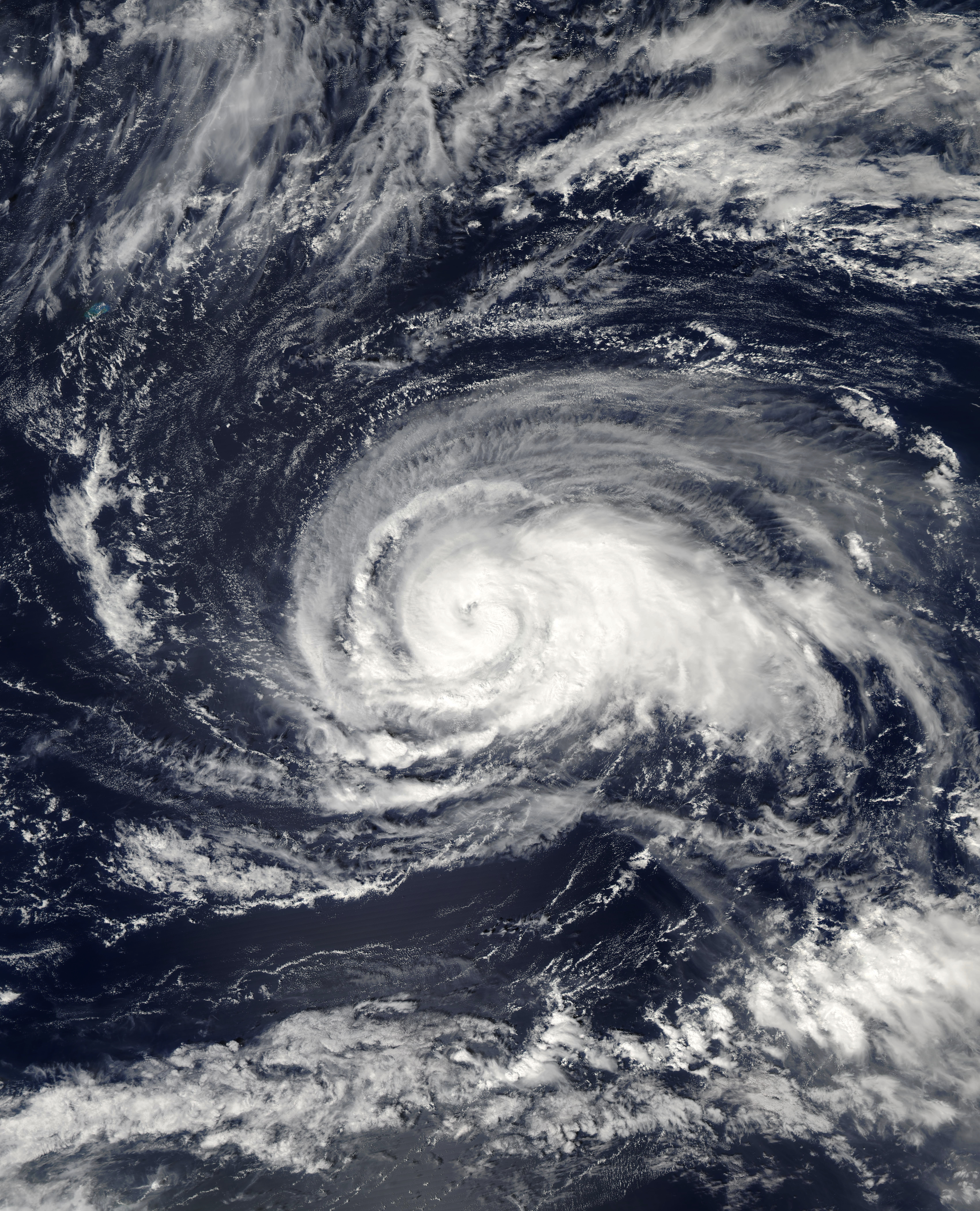
- Kyle near peak intensity on September 26

Meteorological history
- Formed: September 20, 2002
- Extratropical: October 12, 2002
- Dissipated: October 14, 2002

Category 1 hurricane
- 1-minute sustained (SSHWS/NWS)
- Highest winds: 85 mph (140 km/h)
- Lowest pressure: 980 mbar (hPa); 28.94 inHg

Overall effects
- Fatalities: 1 indirect
- Damage: $5 million (2002 USD)
- Areas affected: Bermuda, Florida, Georgia, Carolinas, British Isles
- IBTrACS
- Part of the 2002 Atlantic hurricane season

Hurricane Kyle was one of the longest-lived Atlantic tropical or subtropical cyclone on record. The eleventh named storm and third hurricane of the 2002 Atlantic hurricane season, Kyle developed as a subtropical cyclone on September 20 to the east-southeast of Bermuda. Looping westward, it transitioned into a tropical cyclone and became a hurricane on September 25. For the next two weeks, Kyle tracked generally westward, oscillating in strength several times because of fluctuations in environmental conditions. On October 11, the cyclone turned northeastward and made landfalls near Charleston, South Carolina, and Long Beach, North Carolina, at tropical storm status. After lasting as a cyclone for 22 days, Kyle dissipated on October 12 as it was absorbed by an approaching cold front.

The hurricane brought light precipitation to Bermuda, but no significant damage was reported there. Moderate rainfall accompanied its two landfalls in the United States, causing localized flash flooding and road closures. Floodwaters forced the evacuation of a nursing home and several mobile homes in South Carolina. Kyle spawned at least four tornadoes, the costliest of which struck Georgetown, South Carolina; it damaged 106 buildings and destroyed seven others, causing eight injuries. Overall damage totaled about $5 million (2002 USD, 8.95 million 2026 USD), and no direct deaths were reported. However, the remnants of Kyle contributed to one indirect death in the British Isles.

== Meteorological history ==
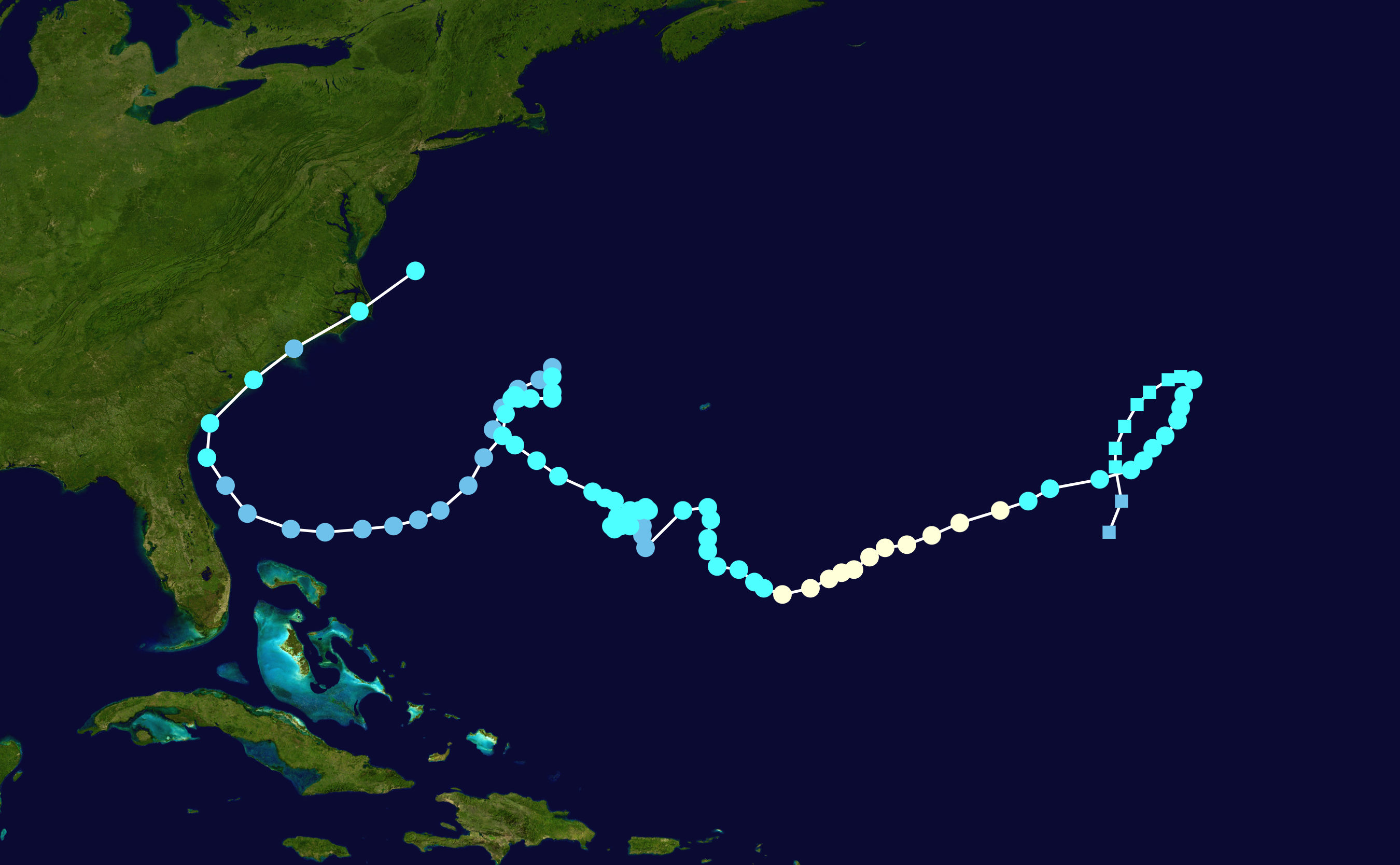
Map plotting the storm's track and intensity, according to the Saffir–Simpson scale Map key Saffir–Simpson scale Tropical depression (≤38 mph, ≤62 km/h) Tropical storm (39–73 mph, 63–118 km/h) Category 1 (74–95 mph, 119–153 km/h) Category 2 (96–110 mph, 154–177 km/h) Category 3 (111–129 mph, 178–208 km/h) Category 4 (130–156 mph, 209–251 km/h) Category 5 (≥157 mph, ≥252 km/h) Unknown Storm type Tropical cyclone Subtropical cyclone Extratropical cyclone, remnant low, tropical disturbance, or monsoon depression

A cold front stalled and began weakening to the southeast of Bermuda on September 15, spawning a low-pressure area by September 18. A stationary wind circulation developed around the low by September 19, aided by a trough aloft to its west. Convection developed into narrow banding features far from the center, and the overall structure gradually consolidated. It is estimated that the system developed into a subtropical depression late on September 20, about 490 miles southeast of Bermuda; it was classified subtropical because of the large distance between the convection and the center, uncharacteristic of purely tropical systems. The cyclone tracked northward within the weak steering flow between an upper-level low to its south and a trough to its north. Strengthening gradually, the depression attained subtropical storm status early on September 21, and as such was named Kyle by the National Hurricane Center.

After being named, Kyle tracked north-northeastward before gradually executing a clockwise loop. Initially, the circulation center remained partly exposed to the south and west of the deep convection. On September 22, the convection increased around the center as the system developed a warm thermal core, and as a result it was reclassified as a fully tropical cyclone. A building anticyclone to the northwest turned Kyle to the southwest. After the storm briefly weakened, previously moderate wind shear began decreasing, which allowed convection to deepen and the outflow over the cyclone to improve. Tracking over progressively warmer waters, Kyle began developing a banding eye feature late on September 24. Slow strengthening continued, and the storm attained hurricane status at 1200 UTC on September 25. The next day, Kyle reached peak winds of 85 mph (137 km/h) about 490 miles east-southeast of Bermuda.

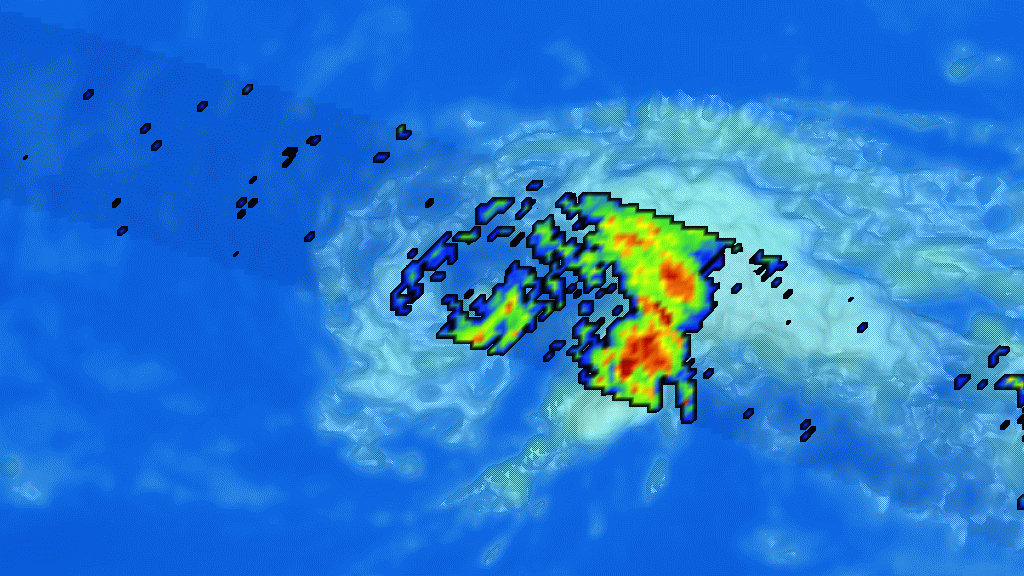
TRMM satellite image of Tropical Storm Kyle on October 3

After maintaining its peak intensity for about 24 hours, Kyle began weakening on September 27 as increased upper-level shear restricted outflow and distorted the convection envelope; drier air also contributed to the weakening. On September 28, after turning west-northwestward, the hurricane weakened to tropical storm status, and by the next day the center had become devoid of deep convection. A trough passing to its north and a developing ridge to its west left the storm nearly stationary for several days. The weakening rate of Kyle was temporarily halted when thunderstorms redeveloped on September 29 and again early the next day, though late on September 30 the storm weakened to tropical depression status. The circulation had become elongated from northeast to southwest. The northeastern portion became associated with the approaching frontal zone, and was briefly monitored for signs of development. However, the southwestern portion redeveloped convection and became the dominant circulation.

Remaining a tropical depression for about 18 hours, Kyle re-intensified to tropical storm status on October 1, after redeveloping some thunderstorms southeast of the center. Despite unfavorable wind shear, the convection became better organized, developing into rain bands and wrapping into the mid-level circulation of the storm. Late on October 2, Kyle developed an eye feature in the center of the storm, and the winds increased to about 65 mph (105 km/h); operationally it was forecast to regain hurricane status. However, the storm encountered further wind shear, which left the center exposed from the convection by early on October 4. Convection became intermittent and separated from the circulation, and Kyle again weakened to tropical depression status on October 5. By then, the storm had begun a steady west-northwest motion, which was followed by a slow turn to the north-northeast. On October 6, a decrease in wind shear allowed the cyclone to again reach tropical storm status, about 295 miles (475 km) west-northwest of Bermuda. Around the same time, the system was located in an area of weak steering currents; a ridge was to its northeast and southwest, an upper-level low was to its east-southeast, and a broad trough was to its northwest. By October 7, it began a slow southwestward motion around a ridge to its west. The circulation became elongated as dry air limited convection, and after shear increased on October 8, Kyle weakened to tropical depression status.

By early on October 9, the depression consisted of a circulation center without any of the associated deep convection that is one of the prerequisites of being a tropical cyclone. Several hurricane forecast models predicted Kyle to weaken until dissipation. After 24 hours without significant convection, thunderstorms reformed to the southeast of the center on October 10 as the depression entered an area of warmer water temperatures. Environmental conditions became more favorable, with weakening wind shear and decreasing dry air. The depression continued tracking around a ridge, turning to the west and west-northwest toward the coast of Florida. Convection increased markedly early on October 11 as it turned northward ahead of an approaching cold front, and Kyle regained tropical storm status about 35 miles (56 km) east of the border between Florida and Georgia.

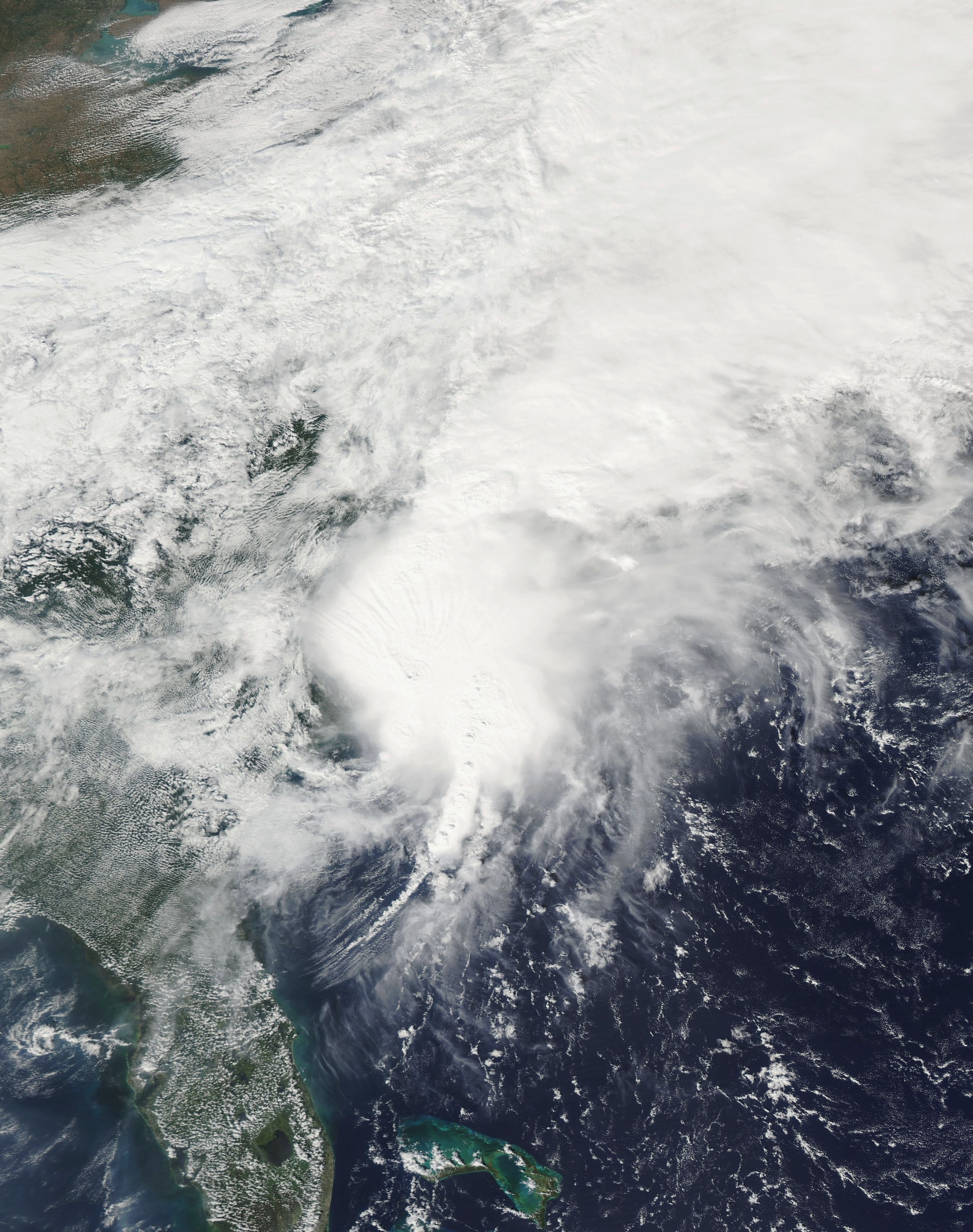
Tropical Storm Kyle making landfall in South Carolina on October 11

After re-attaining tropical storm status, Kyle turned more to the northeast and parallel to the coastline, making landfall near McClellanville, South Carolina as a minimal tropical storm. The storm briefly moved over open waters before again making landfall near Long Beach, North Carolina late on October 11. By early on October 12, the storm had weakened to tropical depression status. At the time of it moving ashore, there was a separate non-tropical low to the northeast of the depression, and shear had greatly increased, which made re-intensification unlikely. However, convection redeveloped baroclinically with the approaching cold front, and Kyle attained tropical storm status for the fifth time over the eastern Pamlico Sound. The restrengthening was short-lived, as the wind field expanded while the convection transitioned into that of a frontal band. After emerging into the western Atlantic Ocean, Tropical Storm Kyle merged with a cold front late on October 12. The remnants of Kyle continued eastward, executing a loop on October 14 before turning northeastward and impacting the Azores on October 17. The next day, the remnants of Kyle were absorbed by an extratropical cyclone to its northwest, which continued northeastward and moved near the British Isles on October 23.

== Preparations ==
Because of uncertainties in its track, the government of Bermuda posted a tropical storm watch for the island on September 30; it was discontinued the following day.

As Kyle approached the coast of Florida, a tropical storm watch was issued between Cocoa Beach, Florida and Brunswick, Georgia, and later was extended northward to Edisto Beach, South Carolina. Early on October 11, a tropical storm warning was put in place between Brunswick, Georgia and Cape Fear, North Carolina, which was later amended to include the Pamlico Sound and the coastline through Surf City, North Carolina. Prior to it making landfall, the National Weather Service office in Wilmington, North Carolina issued a flood watch for much of the coastline that was ultimately affected; in South Carolina, a flood warning was issued for the counties of Florence, Williamsburg, and Georgetown. States of emergencies were declared for ten South Carolina counties.

== Impact ==
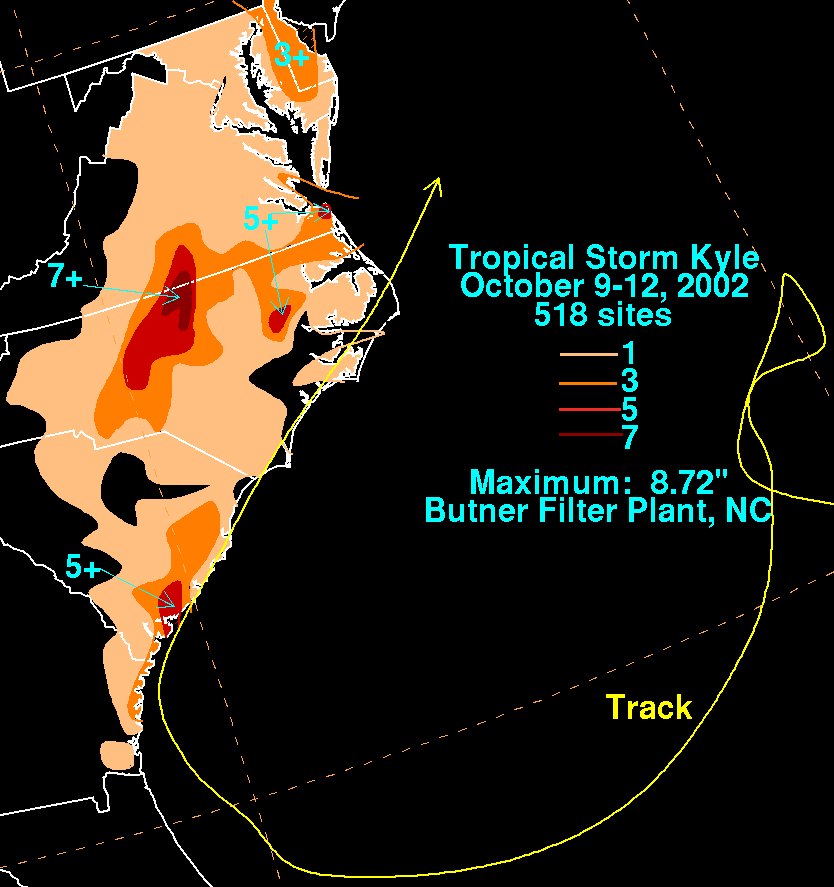
Rainfall totals in the United States from Kyle

On Bermuda, the combination of the storm and a cold front to its north produced 2.19 inches (56 mm) of rainfall in the first two days of October, which was about half of the monthly rainfall total.

While passing near the northeast coast of Florida, Kyle produced a storm surge of 1.31 feet (0.40 m) in Fernandina Beach. Winds were light, with gusts peaking at 32 mph (51 km/h) in St. Augustine, and precipitation reached 2.05 inches (52 mm) in Fernandina Beach. Along the Georgia coastline, the storm dropped moderate rainfall that peaked at 5.35 inches (136 mm) at Hunter Army Airfield. Most of the precipitation fell in a 12‑hour period, which flooded roads and low-lying areas, especially in the Savannah area; several roads were closed, and numerous vehicles stalled in the floodwaters.

Moderate rainfall from Kyle in South Carolina peaked at 6.35 inches (161 mm) in Edisto Beach, with the precipitation resulting in minor urban flooding. In and around St. Stephen, flooding reached several feet in depth in roads and buildings; there, a nursing home had to be evacuated because of flooding. High waters in Manning severely damaged 17 mobile homes, forcing about 50 people to move to shelters. Ten car accidents were reported in Florence. The tropical storm spawned an F2 tornado in Georgetown that remained on the ground for about 1.25 miles (2.01 km). At its peak strength, the tornado overturned five mobile homes and a car. The tornado destroyed seven homes and damaged 106 buildings, 28 severely. Eight people were injured by the tornado.

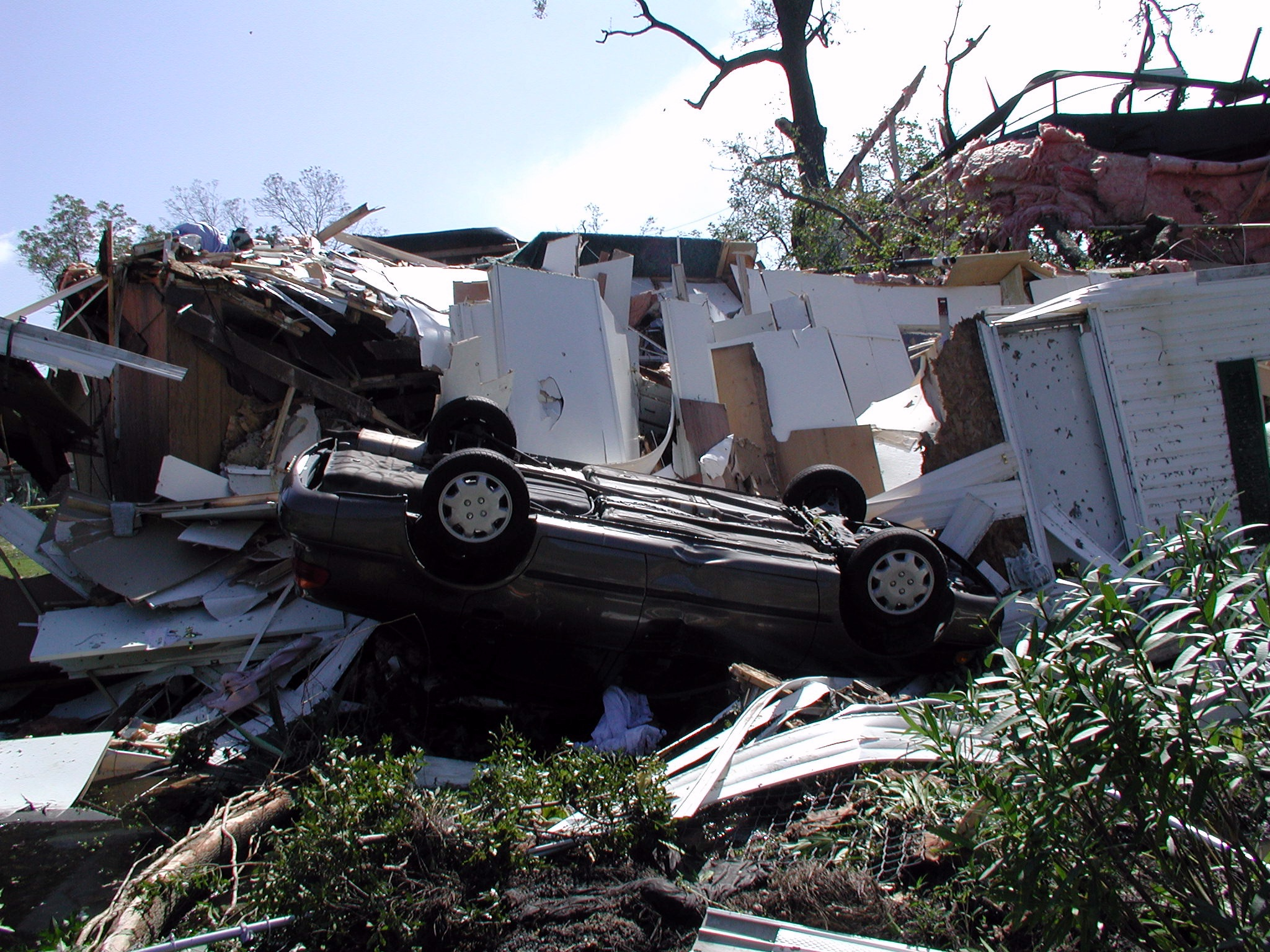
Tornado damage in Georgetown, South Carolina

In North Carolina, above-normal tides caused minor beach erosion. Rainfall near the coastline reached 5.6 inches (140 mm) in Greenville. Moisture from the storm led to increased rainfall further inland, peaking at 8.72 inches (221 mm) in Butner. Raleigh-Durham recorded a two-day rainfall total of 5.79 inches (147 mm), which was the highest two-day total at the station since Hurricane Floyd in 1999. Heavy rainfall caused flash flooding in Martin County, where several roads were closed. Moderate winds were reported in the state, with gusts peaking at 49 mph (79 km/h) on Bald Head Island. The storm spawned at least three tornadoes in the state, including an F2 twister near Pantego that damaged two houses and a farm.

Moisture from Kyle extended into the Mid-Atlantic states and southern New York. The precipitation alleviated rainfall deficits throughout the region. Overall damage amounted to about $5 million (2002 USD, 8.95 million 2026 USD). While no deaths were reported directly from Kyle, its remnants contributed to one death in stormy seas off the British Isles.

== Records ==
Lasting for a total of 22 days, Hurricane Kyle was operationally considered the third-longest-lived tropical cyclone in the Atlantic basin; Kyle was behind Hurricane Ginger in the 1971 season with 27.25 days and Hurricane Inga in the 1969 season with 24.75 days. However, an update to the Atlantic hurricane best track in 2004 led to the San Ciriaco Hurricane of 1899 to be re-analyzed as the longest-lived Atlantic tropical cyclone on record, and as a result Kyle was dropped to the fourth-longest-lived. In September 2012, Hurricane Nadine surpassed Kyle as the fourth-longest-lived cyclone at 22.25 days, dropping Kyle to fifth-longest-lived. Kyle was, at the time, the only Atlantic tropical cyclone on record to attain tropical storm status on five occasions; 2010's Hurricane Tomas subsequently equalled this feat.

== See also ==
- Other tropical cyclones named Kyle
- Timeline of the 2002 Atlantic hurricane season
- Hurricane Ginger
- Hurricane Olga
- List of Florida hurricanes (2000–present)
- List of North Carolina hurricanes (2000–present)
