= 2002 hurricane season =

2002 hurricane season may refer to:

- 2002 Atlantic hurricane season
- 2002 Pacific hurricane season
- 2002 Miami Hurricanes football team
