= 2002 Atlantic hurricane season =

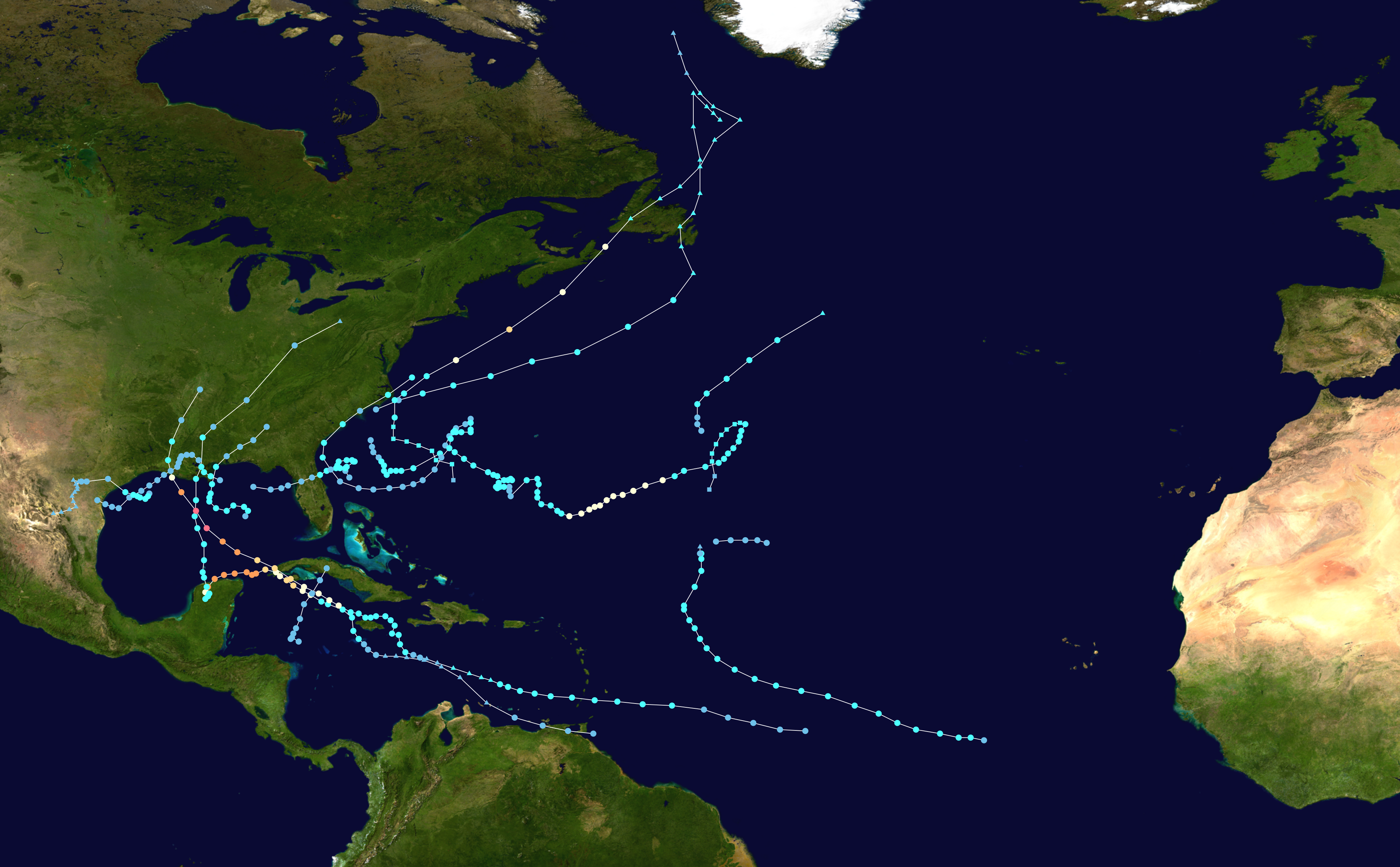
- Season summary map

Seasonal boundaries
- First system formed: July 14, 2002
- Last system dissipated: October 16, 2002

Strongest storm
- By maximum sustained winds: Lili
  - Maximum winds: 145 mph (230 km/h) (1-minute sustained)
  - Lowest pressure: 938 mbar (hPa; 27.7 inHg)
- By central pressure: Isidore
  - Maximum winds: 125 mph (205 km/h) (1-minute sustained)
  - Lowest pressure: 934 mbar (hPa; 27.58 inHg)

Seasonal statistics
- Total depressions: 14
- Total storms: 12
- Hurricanes: 4
- Major hurricanes (Cat. 3+): 2
- ACE: 67
- Total fatalities: 50 total
- Total damage: $2.433 billion (2002 USD)

Related articles
- Timeline of the 2002 Atlantic hurricane season; 2002 Pacific hurricane season; 2002 Pacific typhoon season; 2002 North Indian Ocean cyclone season

The 2002 Atlantic hurricane season featured a then-record eight named storms forming in September. It was a near-average Atlantic hurricane season, producing fourteen tropical cyclones, of which twelve developed into named storms; four became hurricanes, and two attained major hurricane status. The season officially started on June 1, and ended on November 30, dates which conventionally limit the period of each year when most tropical cyclones develop in the Atlantic Ocean. While the season's first cyclone did not develop until July 14, activity quickly picked up: eight storms developed in the month of September. It ended early however, with no tropical storms forming after October 6, a rare occurrence caused partly by El Niño conditions.

The most intense hurricane of the season was Hurricane Isidore, a Category 3 storm on the Saffir–Simpson scale with a minimum atmospheric pressure of 934 mbar (27.6 inHg); however, Hurricane Lili, with a minimum pressure of 938 mbar (27.7 inHg), attained higher winds and peaked at Category 4 status. Both storms also accounted for most of the deaths and damage during the 2002 season. Isidore caused about $1.28 billion in damage and killed seven people in the Yucatán Peninsula and later the United States, and Hurricane Lili, which caused $1.12 billion in damage and 15 deaths as it crossed the Caribbean Sea and eventually made landfall in Louisiana. Collectively, the cyclones of the 2002 Atlantic hurricane season caused approximately $2.43 billion in damage and 50 fatalities.

== Seasonal forecasts ==
Predictions of tropical activity in the 2002 season
Source	Date	Named storms	Hurricanes	Major hurricanes
CSU	Average (1950–2000)	9.6	5.9	2.3
NOAA	Average (1950–2005)	11.0	6.2	2.7
Record high activity		30	15	7
Record low activity		1	0	0
CSU	December 7, 2001	13	8	4
CSU	April 5, 2002	12	7	3
NOAA	May 20, 2002	9–13	6–8	2–3
CSU	August 7, 2002	9	4	1
NOAA	August 8, 2002	7–10	4–6	1–3
CSU	September 3, 2002	8	3	1
Actual activity		12	4	2

Noted hurricane expert William M. Gray and his associates at Colorado State University issue forecasts of hurricane activity each year, separately from the National Oceanic and Atmospheric Administration (NOAA). Gray's team determined the average number of storms per season between 1950 and 2000 to be 9.6 tropical storms, 5.9 hurricanes, and 2.3 major hurricanes (storms exceeding Category 3). A normal season, as defined by NOAA, has 9 to 12 named storms, of which 5 to 7 reach hurricane strength and 1 to 3 become major hurricanes.

=== Pre-season forecasts ===
On December 7, 2001, Gray's team issued its first extended-range forecast for the 2002 season, predicting above-average activity (13 named storms, 8 hurricanes, and about 2 of Category 3 or higher). It listed an 86 percent chance of at least one major hurricane striking the U.S. mainland. This included a 58 percent chance of at least one major hurricane strike on the East Coast, including the Florida peninsula, and a 43 percent chance of at least one such strike on the Gulf Coast from the Florida Panhandle westward. The potential for major hurricane activity in the Caribbean was forecast to be above average.

On April 5 a new forecast was issued, calling for 12 named storms, 7 hurricanes and 3 intense hurricanes. The decrease in the forecast was attributed to the further intensification of El Niño conditions. The estimated potential for at least one major hurricane to affect the U.S. was decreased to 75 percent; the East Coast potential decreased slightly to 57 percent, and from the Florida Panhandle westward to Brownsville, Texas, the probability remained the same.

NOAA issued their first seasonal forecast on May 20, predicting 9–13 named storms, 6–8 hurricanes, and 2–3 major hurricanes. The government agency stated that the season would most likely be near-average because of a combination of the ongoing high-activity era and an expected weak El Niño, but acknowledged some uncertainty existed due to a lack of strong El Niño or La Niña conditions.

=== Mid-season forecasts ===
On August 7, Gray's team lowered its season estimate to 9 named storms, with 4 becoming hurricanes and 1 becoming a major hurricane, noting that conditions had become less favorable for storms than they had been earlier in the year. The sea-level pressure and trade wind strength in the tropical Atlantic were reported to be above normal, while sea surface temperature anomalies were on a decreasing trend.

On August 8, NOAA revised its season estimate to 7–10 named storms, with 4–6 becoming hurricanes and 1–3 becoming major hurricanes. The reduction was attributed to less favorable environmental conditions and building El Niño conditions.

Gray and his forecast team at CSU decreased their seasonal predictions again on September 3, calling for 8 named storms, 3 hurricanes, and 1 major hurricane, with Gray noting an "unusual and unexpected massive rearrangement of global ocean and atmospheric conditions the last three to four months". This included below normal sea surface temperatures, an intensifying El Niño, and abnormally strong sea-level pressure, easterly trade winds, and upper tropospheric westerly winds.

== Seasonal summary ==
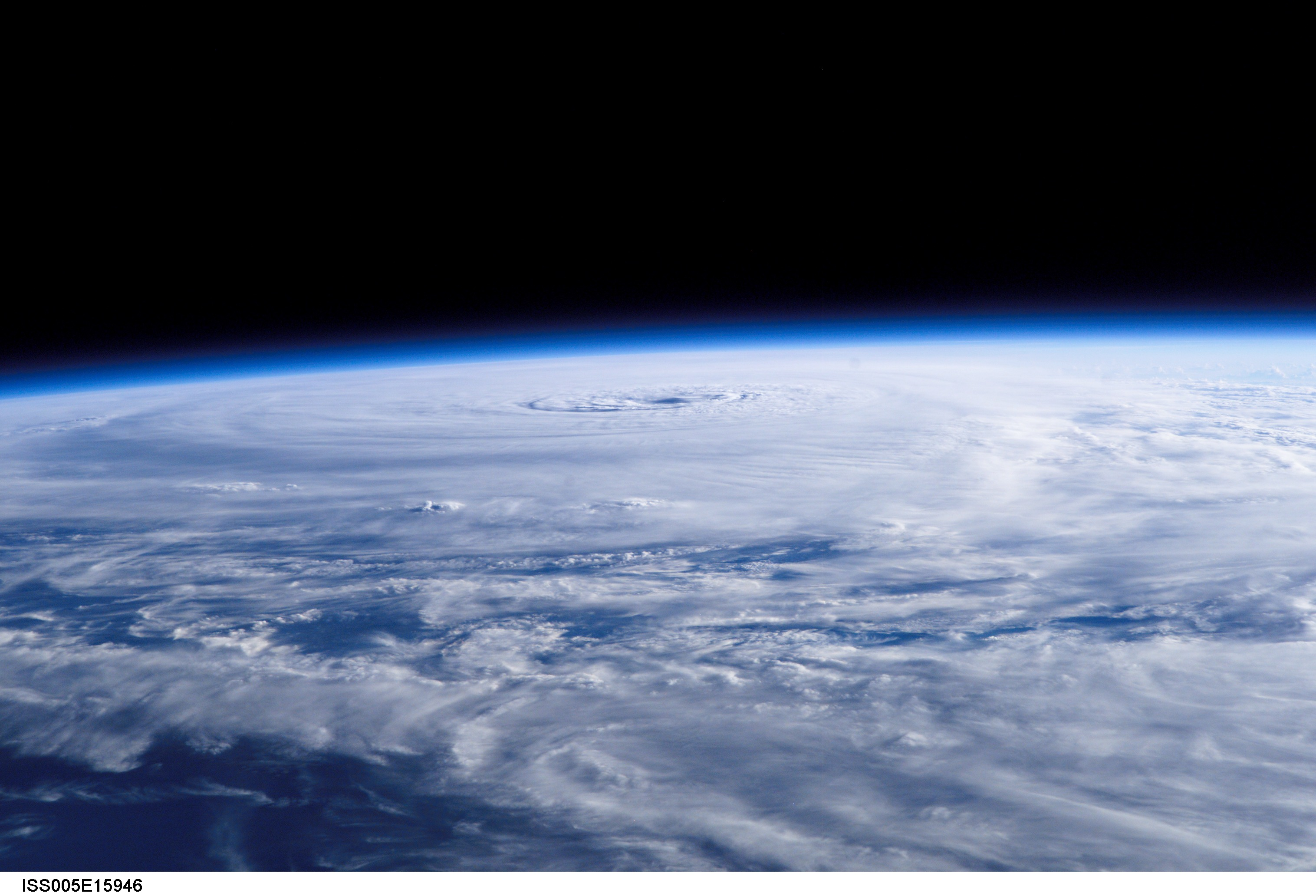
Hurricane Lili over the Gulf of Mexico on October 2, as seen by the International Space Station

The Atlantic hurricane season officially began on June 1, 2002. It was a near-average season in which 14 tropical cyclones formed. Twelve depressions attained tropical storm status, and four of these reached hurricane status. Two hurricanes further intensified into major hurricanes. Activity was suppressed somewhat by an El Niño, which was of near-moderate intensity by August. A near-record eight named storms made landfall in the United States, (Note: In 1916, nine systems made landfall in the United States.) four of them came ashore in Louisiana. Overall, the Atlantic tropical cyclones of 2002 collectively resulted in 50 deaths and around $2.43 billion in damage. The season ended on November 30, 2002.

Tropical cyclogenesis began with Tropical Storm Arthur, which formed just offshore North Carolina on July 14. Following the storm's extratropical transition on July 16, no further activity occurred until Tropical Storm Bertha developed near Louisiana on August 4. Cristobal formed on the next day, while Dolly developed on August 29. September featured eight named storms, a record which was later tied in 2007 and 2010 and surpassed in 2020. During that month, Gustav reached hurricane intensity on September 11, the latest date for the first hurricane in a season since 1941. While the long-lasting Kyle and Lili persisted into October, only one tropical cyclone developed that month, Tropical Depression Fourteen on October 14. The depression was absorbed by a cold front while crossing Cuba two days later, ending seasonal activity.

The season's activity was reflected with a low accumulated cyclone energy (ACE) rating of 67, the lowest total since 1997. ACE is, broadly speaking, a measure of the power of the hurricane multiplied by the length of time it existed, so storms that last a long time, as well as particularly strong hurricanes, have high ACEs. It is only calculated for full advisories on tropical systems at or exceeding 39 mph (63 km/h), which is the threshold for tropical storm status.

== Systems ==
=== Tropical Storm Arthur ===
- Tropical storm (SSHWS)
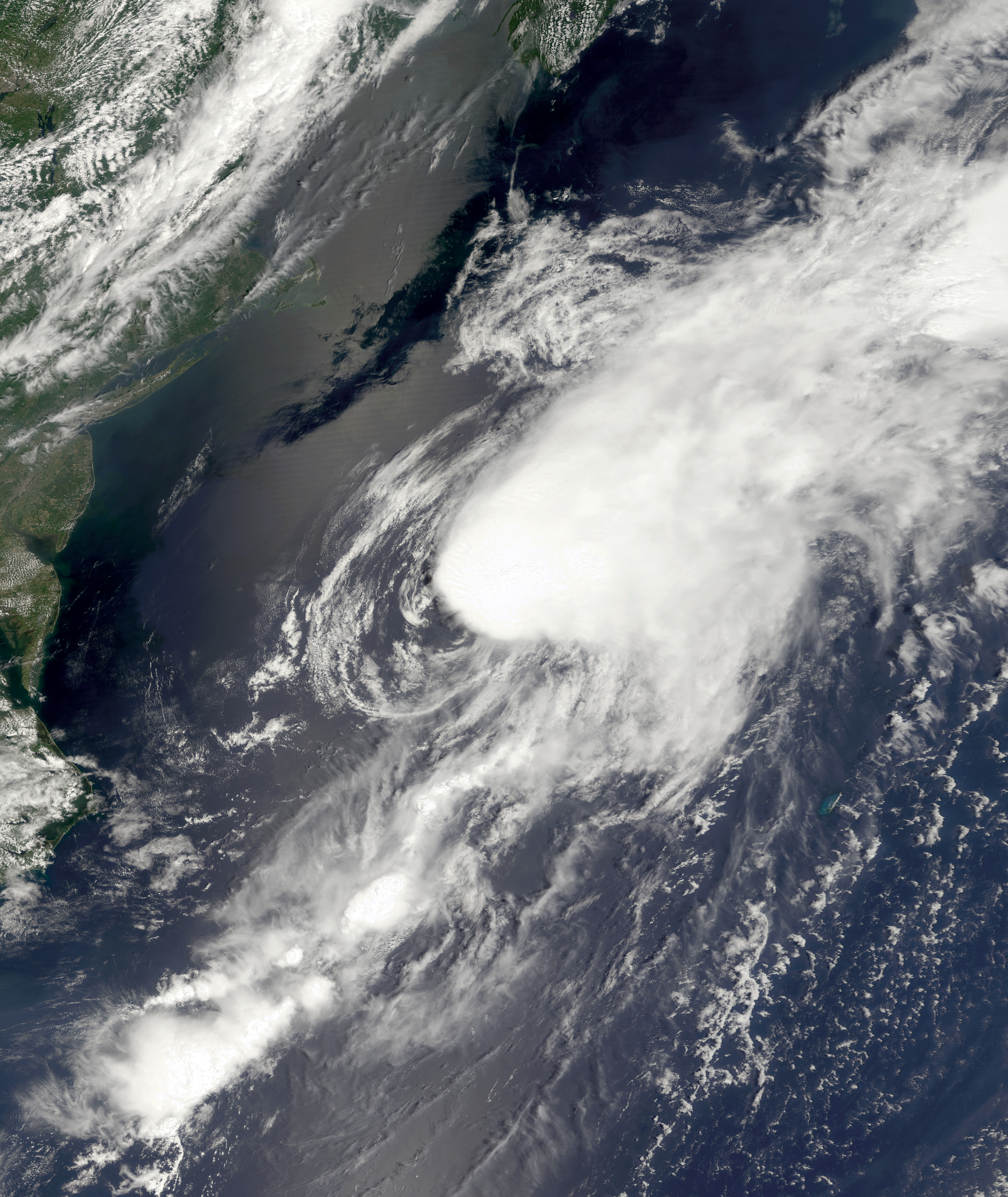
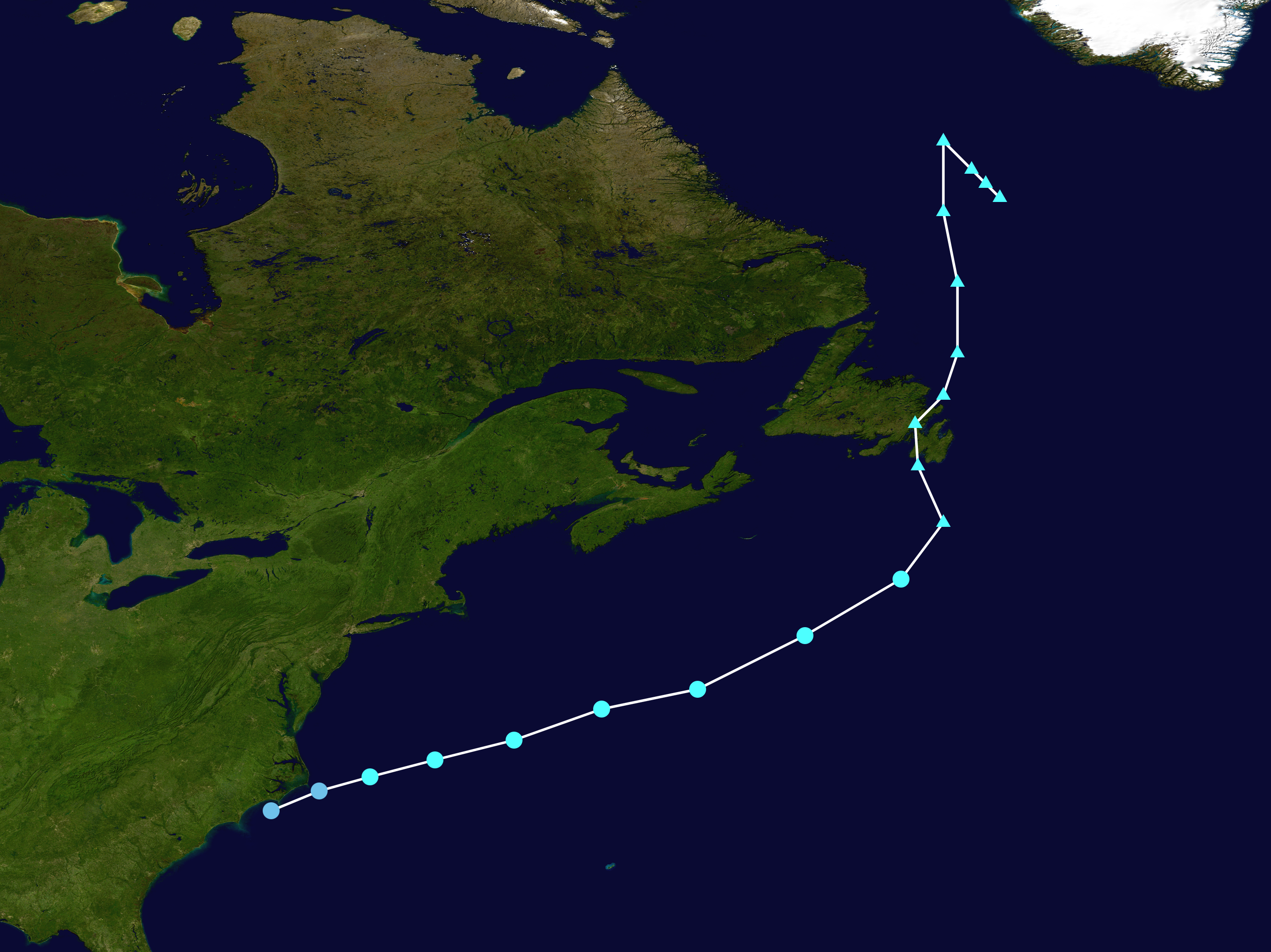
- Duration: July 14 – July 16
- Peak intensity: 60 mph (95 km/h) (1-min); 997 mbar (hPa)

A dissipating cold front stalled over the northeastern Gulf of Mexico in early July, producing a weak low-level circulation on July 9. The system then drifted for a few days, until a mid-level trough moved the circulation across the southeastern United States on July 13. On the next day, the system moved along the coast of the Carolinas, producing an organized area of convection over its center, which became, Tropical Depression One several hours later about 45 mi (70 km) west-southwest of Hatteras, North Carolina, A deepening mid-level low south of Atlantic Canada caused the depression to move quickly east-northeastward and cross the Gulf Stream, allowing it to intensify into Tropical Storm Arthur on July 15 as rainbands developed. Arthur peaked with winds of 60 mph (95 km/h) and a minimum pressure of 997 mbar (29.4 inHg) early on July 16. Thereafter, the center became separated from the area of deepest convection, and Arthur became an extratropical cyclone on July 16 about 145 mi (235 km) south of Cape Race, Newfoundland. The storm turned northward around a larger mid-level low, moving over eastern Newfoundland before drifting southeastward between Newfoundland and Greenland on July 19, and by late in the day its winds decreased to below gale-force.

The precursor tropical disturbance dropped rainfall across Florida, Georgia, and South Carolina, peaking at 4.49 in (114 mm) in Weston, Florida. The system produced scattered precipitation across North Carolina, generally between 1–3 in (25–76 mm). On July 16, Arthur passed north of Bermuda, where it brought gusty winds and 0.57 in (14 mm) of rainfall. As an extratropical storm, Arthur produced gusty winds and dropped about 1 in (25 mm) of rainfall in Newfoundland. Strong waves capsized a boat in the Conne River, killing one person.

=== Tropical Storm Bertha ===
- Tropical storm (SSHWS)
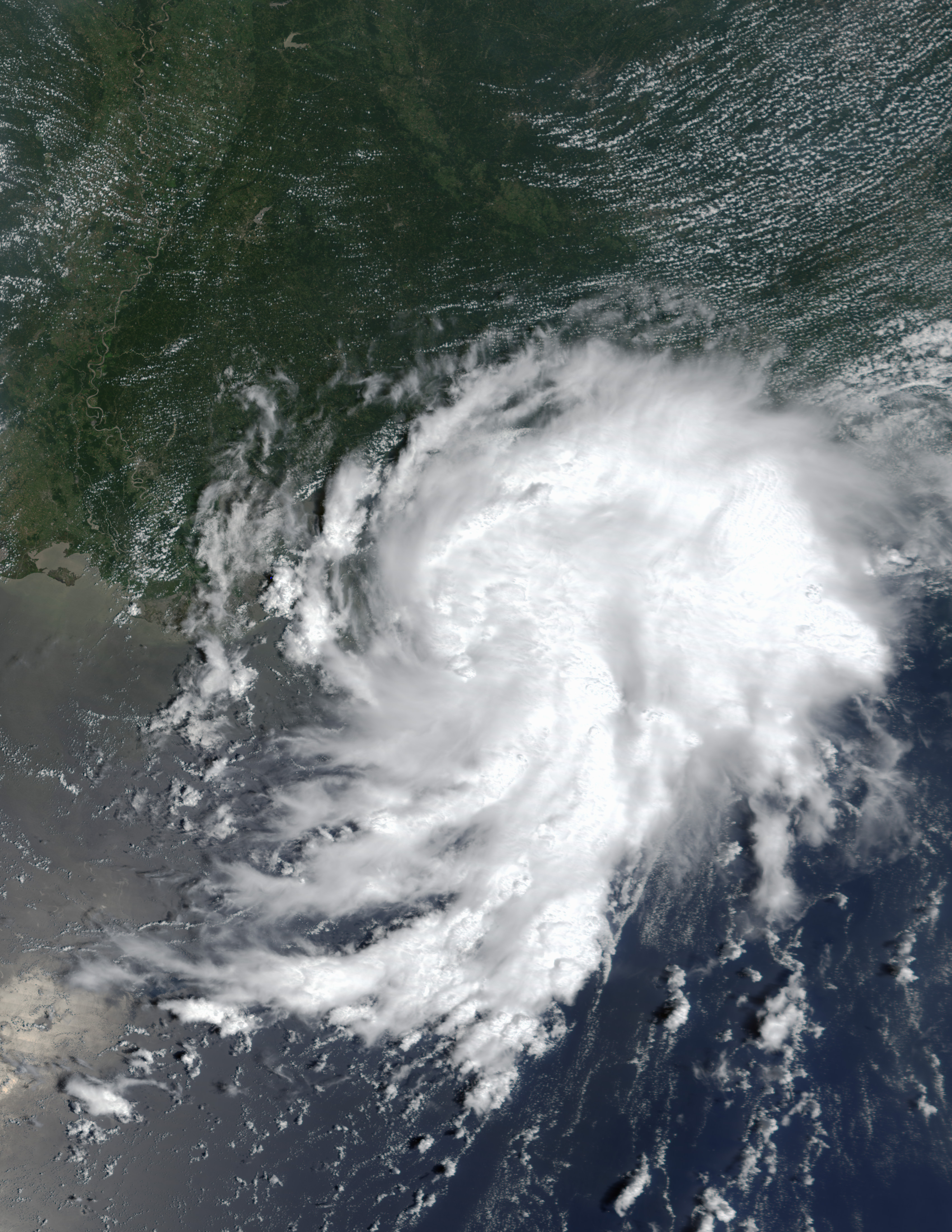
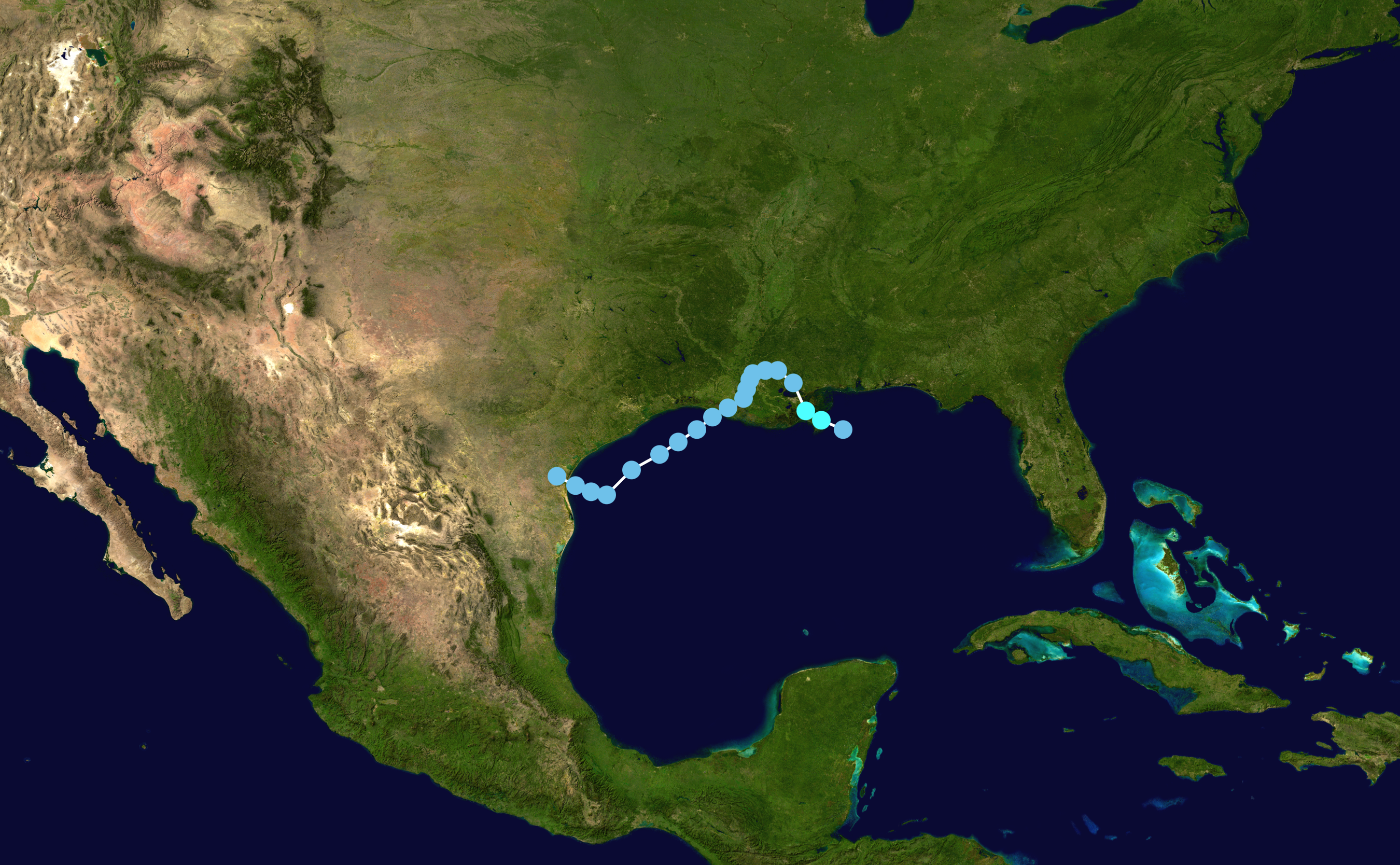
- Duration: August 4 – August 9
- Peak intensity: 40 mph (65 km/h) (1-min); 1007 mbar (hPa)

In early August, a surface trough extended from the northern Gulf of Mexico across Florida into the western Atlantic Ocean. The eastern portion ultimately became Tropical Storm Cristobal. The western portion developed into a low pressure area on August 3 over the Gulf of Mexico. Late on August 4, the low organized into Tropical Depression Two just east of the mouth of the Mississippi River. It soon strengthened into Tropical Storm Bertha, as outflow and rainbands developed. At 02:00 UTC, Bertha made landfall near Boothville, Louisiana with peak winds of 40 mph (65 km/h). After crossing Lake Pontchartrain, the storm fell to tropical depression status. The track shifted to the southwest, steered around the periphery of a ridge. Bertha emerged back over the Gulf of Mexico again on August 7, developing intermittent thunderstorms. However, it failed to restrengthen due to proximity to land. On August 9, Bertha made its second and final landfall near Kingsville, Texas as a tropical depression, dissipating ten hours later.

The National Hurricane Center issued a tropical storm warning from Pascagoula, Mississippi to the mouth of the Mississippi River, shortly before Bertha made landfall. The National Weather Service advised boats along the Gulf coast to remain at port. The service also issued a coastal flood watch from Alabama through the Florida Panhandle. A flood watch was issued for portions of eastern Louisiana and southwestern Mississippi. The precursor to Bertha generated rip currents along the Florida coastline. In Perdido Key State Recreation Area, one person drowned, and two children required rescue from the currents. Rainfall in Florida reached 3.08 in (78 mm) near Clermont. The highest rainfall in Alabama was 4.40 in (112 mm) in Coden. Upon Bertha making landfall, Waveland, Mississippi recorded a peak storm surge of 4.12 ft (1.26 m). Sustained winds there peaked at 31 mph (50 km/h), and a peak gust of 41 mph (66 km/h). Rainfall from Bertha reached 10.25 inches (260 mm) in Pascagoula. In Moss Point, the rainfall resulted in flooding which entered at least 15 houses and several cars. The rainfall also flooded roadways and streets. Damage in Mississippi totaled to at least $50,000 (2002 USD). The storm dropped heavy rainfall in Louisiana, which peaked at 10.25 inches (260 mm) in Norwood. The mouth of the Bayou Dupre recorded a storm tide of 3.79 feet (1.16 m). The rainfall led to flash flooding, which entered buildings in East Feliciana Parish while also covering roads and bridges. Rivers overflowed in St. Tammany Parish. Damage in Louisiana totaled $150,000 (2002 USD). In Texas, Bertha produced a storm tide of 3 feet (0.91 m) at Baffin Bay. Rainfall in the state reached 4.14 in (105 mm) in Dumas.

=== Tropical Storm Cristobal ===
- Tropical storm (SSHWS)
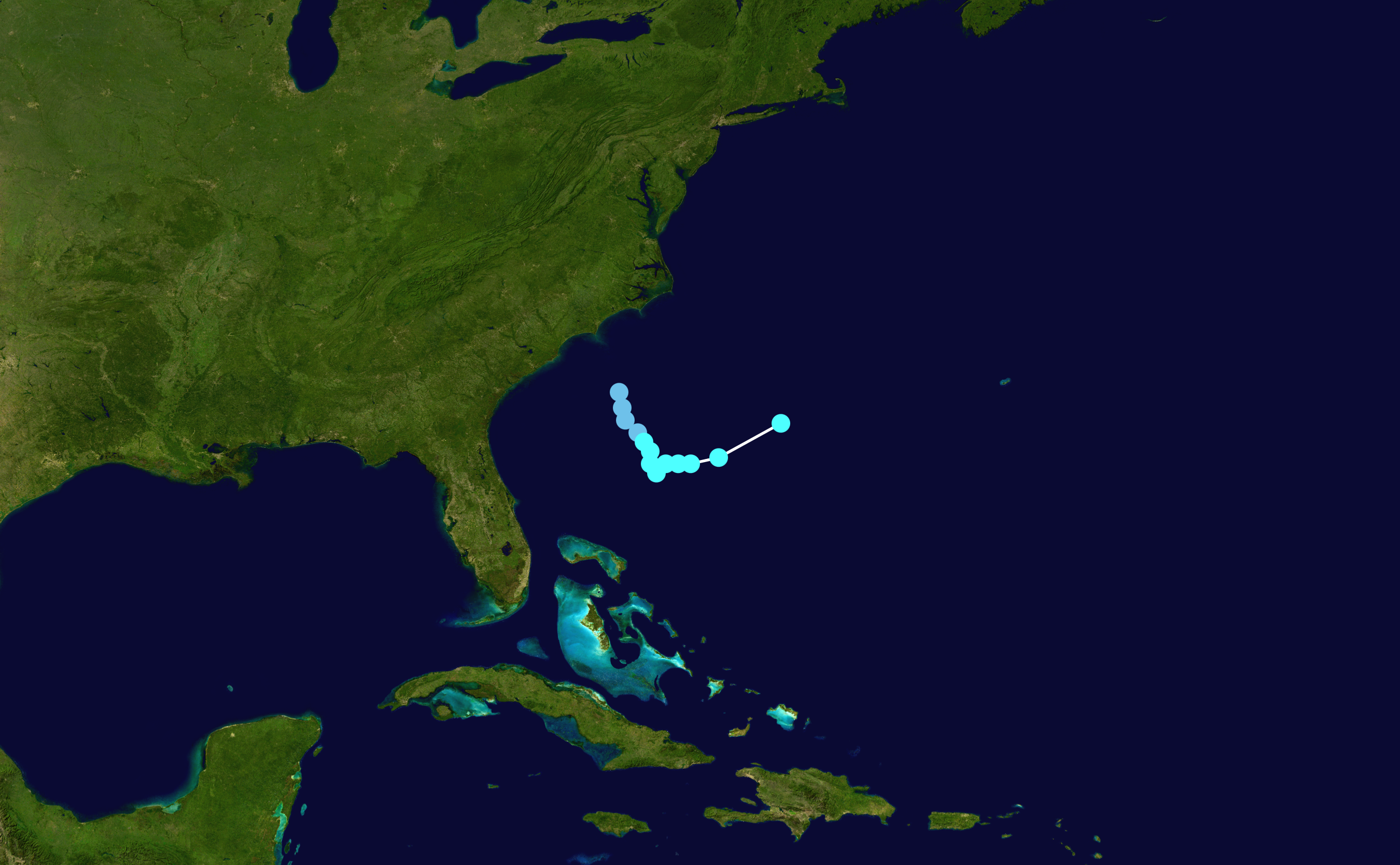
- Duration: August 5 – August 8
- Peak intensity: 50 mph (85 km/h) (1-min); 999 mbar (hPa)

A trough, which produced Bertha in the Gulf of Mexico, extended from there to the western Atlantic in early August and spawned a low-pressure area offshore South Carolina. The low moved eastward and organized into a tropical depression late on August 5 about 175 mi (280 km/h) east-southeast of Charleston. The depression alreadly possessed rainbands and outflow and initially moved southeastward around the northeastern periphery of an anticyclone over Florida. Although the convection was confined to its southern half, the depression intensified into Tropical Storm Cristobal on August 6. The storm turned eastward on the next day due to an approaching large mid to upper-level frontal zone. As the convection organized further, Cristobal intensified slightly and peaked with winds of 50 mph (85 km/h) and a minimum pressure of 999 mbar (29.5 inHg). On August 8, Cristobal accelerated east-northeastward as dry air weakened its convection. The low-level circulation interacted with the approaching frontal zone, and by 00:00 UTC on August 9, Cristobal was absorbed by the cold front about 350 mi (560 km) southeast of Cape Hatteras, North Carolina. The remnants continued northeastward, passing near Newfoundland on August 10 before weakening near Greenland on August 14.

As a tropical cyclone, Cristobal had minimal effects on land. However, its remnants brought unsettled conditions to Bermuda, including a 45 mph (72 km/h) wind gust at the international airport. The combination of moisture from Cristobal and cold front into which it was absorbed produced 2.78 in (71 mm) of rain there in a 24‑hour period. An annual powerboat race circumnavigating Bermuda had to be postponed by a week because of the adverse weather. Cristobal produced rough seas and rip currents along portions of the U.S. East Coast. On August 9, lifeguards in Volusia County, Florida, rescued about 25 swimmers caught in rip currents. Offshore winds from the storm were credited with ending a widespread outbreak of jellyfish stings affecting bathers along the northeast coast of Florida. Some 1,000 stings had been reported. Later, the extratropical remnants of Cristobal continued to interact with a high pressure system over the Mid-Atlantic states to generate dangerous swimming conditions further north. Along the south shore of Long Island, New York, significant wave heights reached 4 ft (1.2 m), and rip currents resulted in three drowning deaths: one in Montauk; one just east of Moriches Inlet; and one off Rockaway Beach. In the latter case, the victim had become exhausted after swimming out to save his son-in-law, an inexperienced swimmer, from the rip current.

=== Tropical Storm Dolly ===
- Tropical storm (SSHWS)
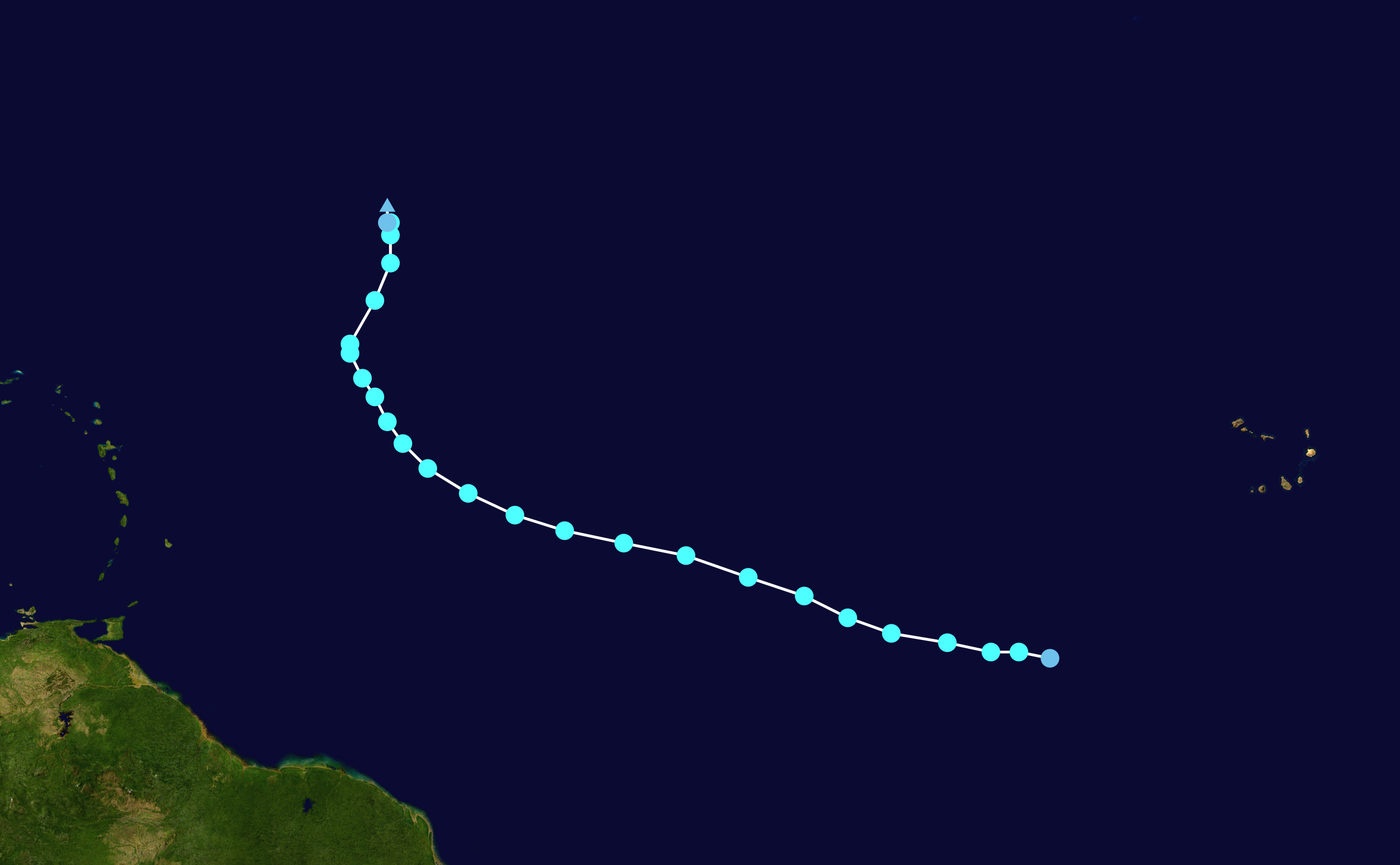
- Duration: August 29 – September 4
- Peak intensity: 60 mph (95 km/h) (1-min); 997 mbar (hPa)

A tropical wave exited the African coast on August 27, and with favorable conditions the system organized into Tropical Depression Four on August 29 about 630 mi (1,010 km) southwest of Cape Verde. Six hours later, the depression was upgraded to Tropical Storm Dolly after developing sufficient outflow and curved banding features. The storm continued to intensify as more convection developed, and Dolly peaked with maximum sustained winds of 60 mph (95 km/h) and a minimum barometric pressure of 997 mbar (29.4 inHg) on August 30. After peaking in intensity, the storm suddenly lost organization and weakened to a minimal tropical storm. The cyclone began moving in a more northward direction by September 2 because of an approaching mid-level trough. After a brief re-intensification trend, Dolly again weakened due to wind shear and fell to tropical depression status on September 4, several hours before being absorbed by the trough approximately 740 mi (1,190 km) northeast of the Leeward Islands.

=== Tropical Storm Edouard ===
- Tropical storm (SSHWS)
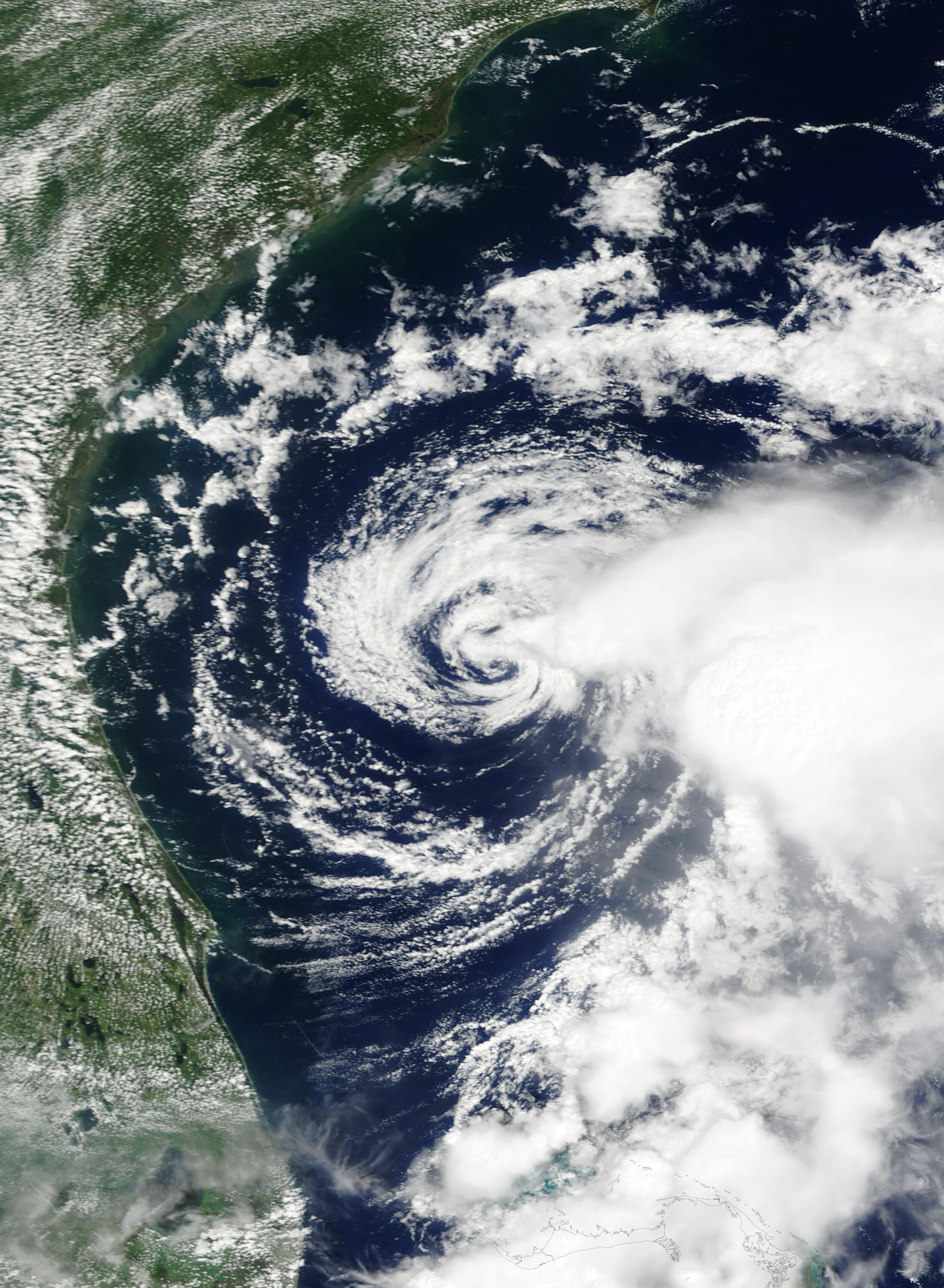
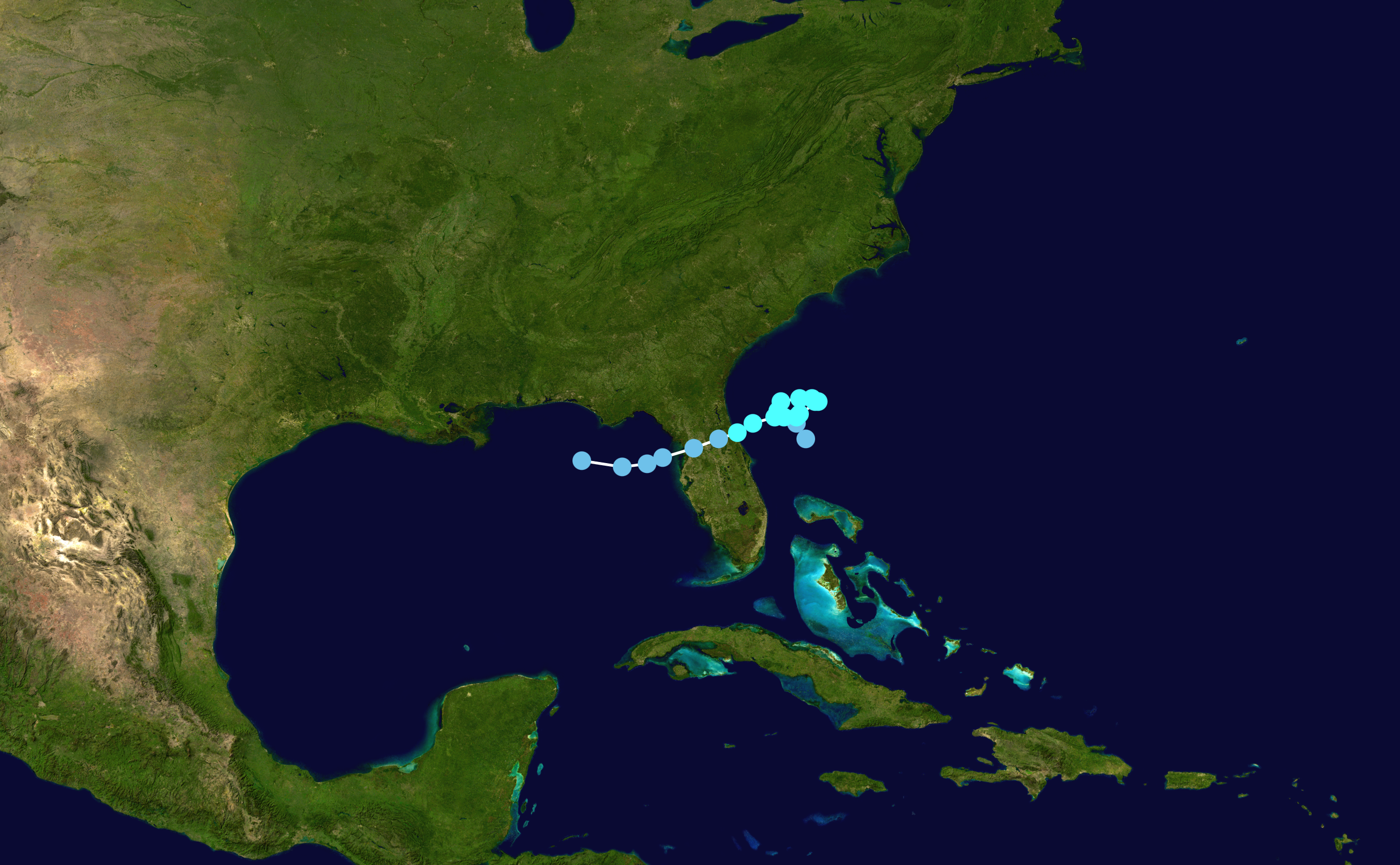
- Duration: September 1 – September 6
- Peak intensity: 65 mph (100 km/h) (1-min); 1002 mbar (hPa)

An area of convection developed east-southeast of Bermuda on August 25, likely related to a dissipating cold front. The system moved to the southwest and interacted with an upper-level trough to the north of Puerto Rico, which increased the convection. A broad low-pressure area developed on August 31 near the northern Bahamas. After the convection became better organized, the system developed into Tropical Depression Five on September 1, about 140 miles (230 km) east of Daytona Beach, Florida. The depression moved to the northwest at first, steered by a ridge to its northwest. Despite the presence of wind shear and dry air, the depression intensified into Tropical Storm Edouard on September 2, although the strongest thunderstorms were displaced from the circulation. Edouard began a small loop of Florida's east coast amid weak steering currents. On September 3, the storm strengthened to reached peak winds of 65 mph (105 km/h). Shortly after peaking in intensity, Edouard began to weaken as convection diminished from vertical shear and dry air, with its center becoming exposed from the steadily decreasing convection later on September 3. The development of a weak and narrow mid-level ridge turned the storm to the west-southwest towards northeastern Florida. Despite strong levels of wind shear, Edouard remained a tropical storm while producing sporadic amounts of deep convection, with the banding structure improving on September 4. Early on September 5, Edouard made landfall near Ormond Beach, Florida as a minimal tropical storm, and almost immediately weakened to a tropical depression over land. It tracked across the state for about 13 hours and entered the Gulf of Mexico near Crystal River. Upon entering the Gulf of Mexico, the depression encountered strong wind shear from the outflow of developing Tropical Storm Fay. The remaining convection disappeared by September 6, and Edouard dissipated while becoming absorbed into the larger circulation of Tropical Storm Fay.

The NHC issued tropical storm watches and warnings for the southeastern United States. This included parts of Florida and Georgia that were under a tropical storm warning on two occasions. The National Weather Service issued a flood watch hours before Edouard made landfall for much of eastern Florida due to the expected rainfall from the storm. While moving erratically off the east coast of Florida, Edouard produced rough surf conditions and rip currents along many beaches. Beachgoers and visitors were advised to exercise extreme caution. Ahead of the storm, wind gusts reached 39 mph (63 km/h) at Patrick Air Force Base. Edouard dropped rainfall across the state, peaking at 7.64 inches (194 mm) in DeSoto County The rains caused river flooding along the St. Johns River, resulting in flooding along roads in Seminole County. Roadway, urban, and lowland flooding was also reported in the counties of Brevard and Orange. Roadway flooding was extensive in some areas, resulting in road closures in Oviedo, Cocoa Beach, and Cape Canaveral. Heavy rainfall in Pinellas Park caused heavy street flooding along an intersection on U.S. Highway 19.

=== Tropical Storm Fay ===
- Tropical storm (SSHWS)
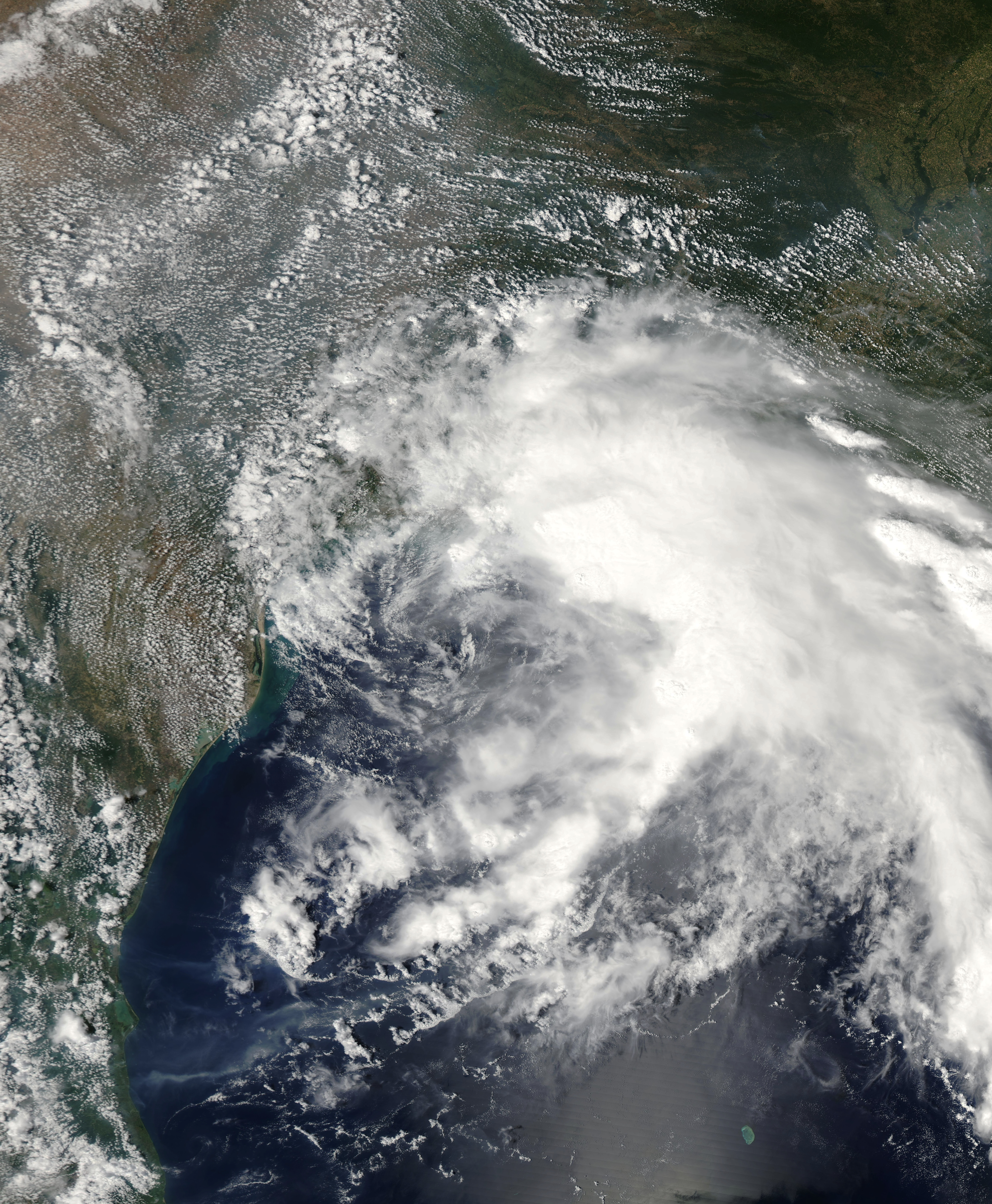
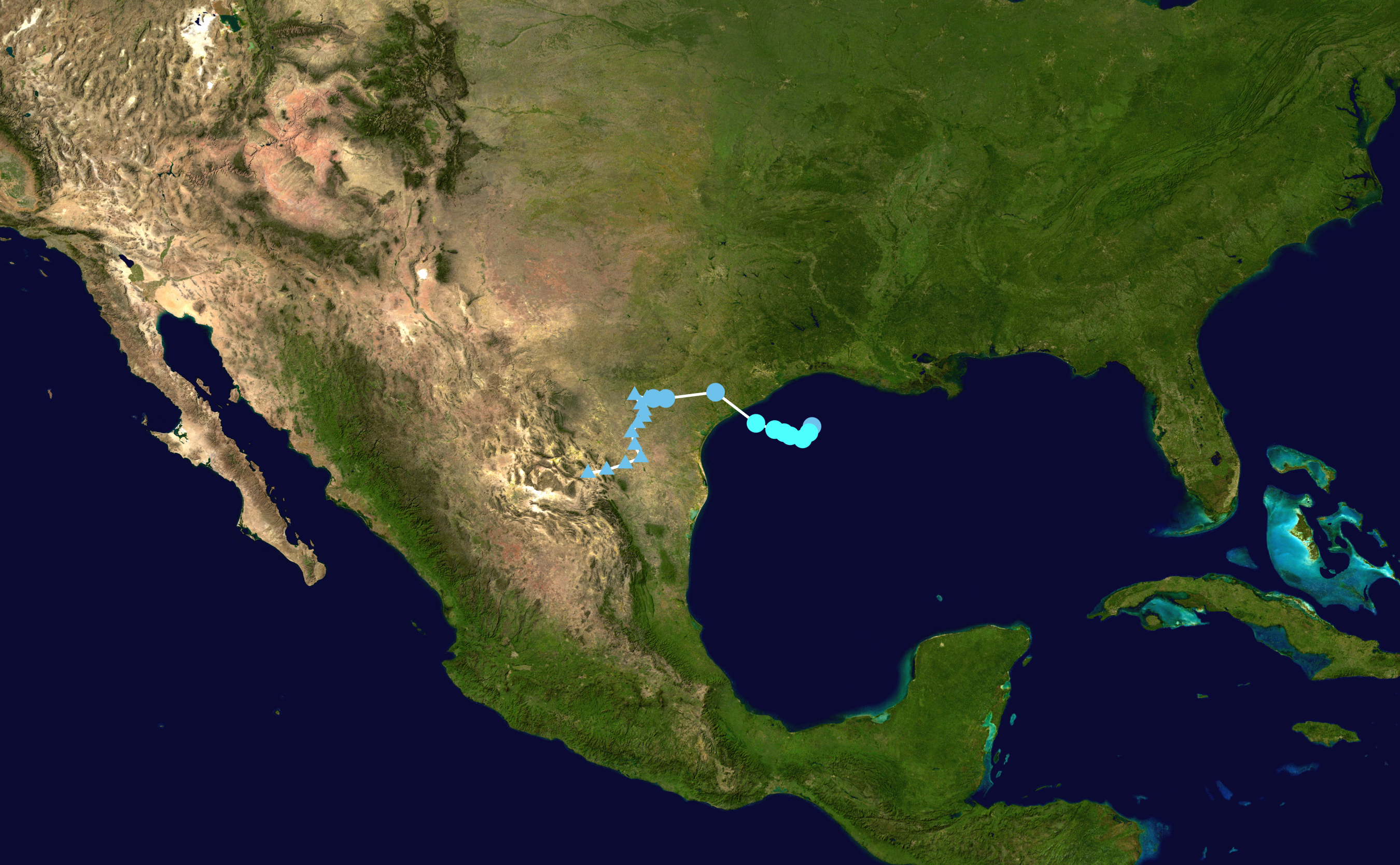
- Duration: September 5 – September 8
- Peak intensity: 60 mph (95 km/h) (1-min); 998 mbar (hPa)

In early September, a low pressure center developed along a trough of low pressure, and on September 5, the system had gained sufficient organization to be a tropical depression approximately 100 mi (155 km) southeast of Galveston, Texas. The depression drifted south-southwest while strengthening into Tropical Storm Fay early on September 6 and reached its peak strength with winds of 60 mph (95 km/h) and a minimum pressure of 998 mbar (29.5 inHg) about 24 hours later. The system then abruptly turned to the west-northwest, and remained steady in strength and course until landfall near Matagorda, Texas, at 09:00 UTC on September 7. It quickly degenerated into a remnant low, which itself moved slowly southwestward over Texas. The low eventually dissipated on September 11 over northeastern Mexico.

In Texas, Fay spawned six tornadoes, dropped heavy rains, and produced extended periods of tropical storm-force winds. Those winds and tornadoes damaged about 900 homes and almost 100 businesses in Brazoria County alone, while floodwaters also entered over 1,500 homes and nearly 500 cars in that county. Nearby, Galveston, Matagorda, and Wharton counties each reported damage to hundreds of homes. Fay caused approximately $5 million in damage in the United States. Heavy rains also fell in northeastern Mexico. At least hundreds of families fled their homes due to flooding concerns, with approximately 300 families reporting that they could not return for several weeks.

=== Tropical Depression Seven ===
- Tropical depression (SSHWS)
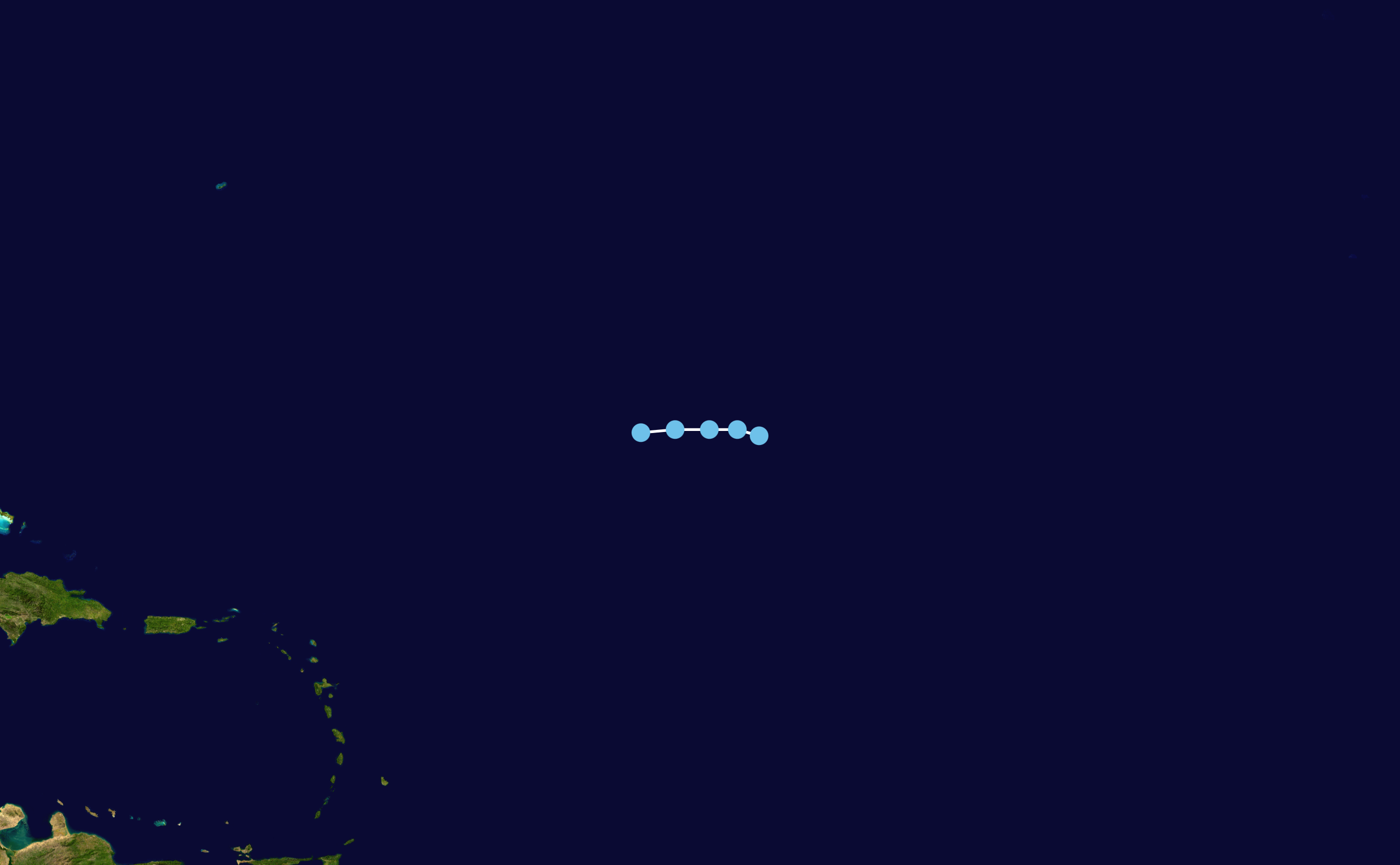
- Duration: September 7 – September 8
- Peak intensity: 35 mph (55 km/h) (1-min); 1013 mbar (hPa)

A tropical wave exited Africa on September 1, and after initial development became disorganized. It moved west-northwestward for a week, reorganizing enough by September 7 to be declared Tropical Depression Seven about 1,155 mi (1,860 km) east-southeast of Bermuda. At the time, the depression had persistent convection around a small circulation, and it moved steadily westward due to a ridge to its north. Shortly after forming, strong wind shear diminished the convection and left the center partially exposed. Thus, the depression did not strengthen beyond winds of 35 mph (55 km/h) and a minimum pressure of 1,013 mbar (29.9 inHg). By September 8, there was no remaining thunderstorm activity, and the depression degenerated into a remnant low-pressure area. The storm dissipated shortly after as strong wind shear continued to cause the storm to deteriorate while located 980 mi (1580 mi) southeast of Bermuda.

=== Hurricane Gustav ===
- Category 2 hurricane (SSHWS)
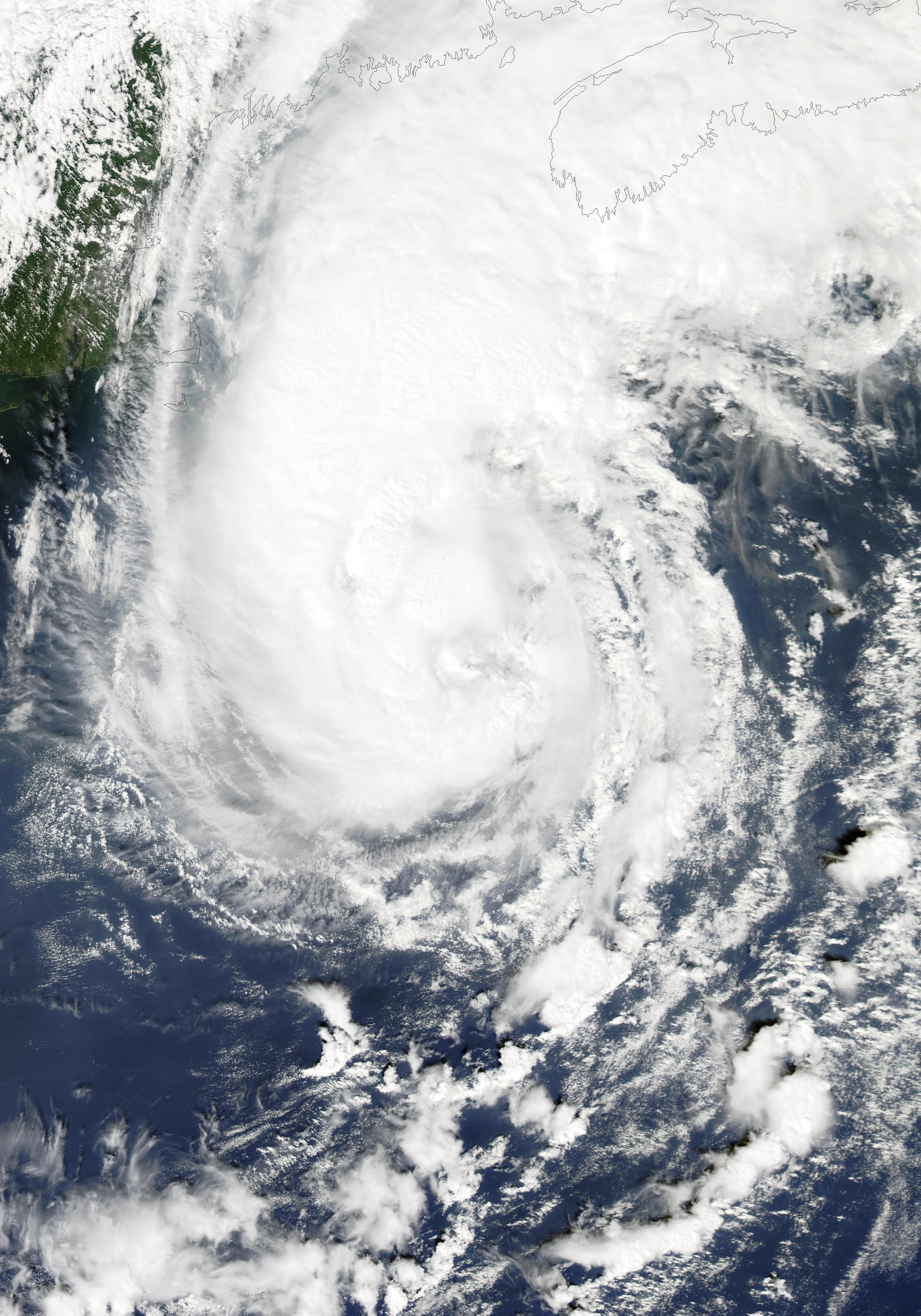
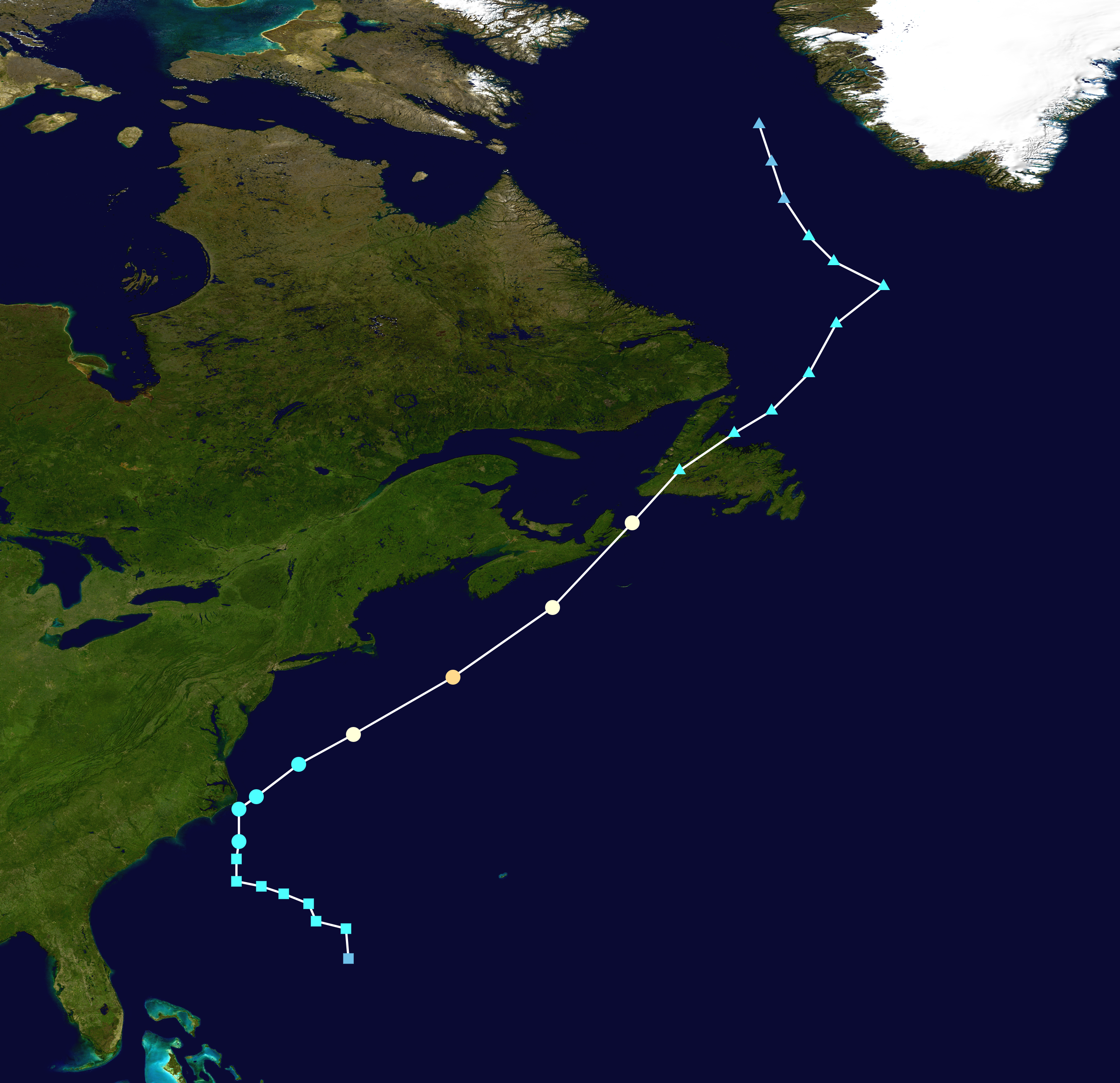
- Duration: September 8 – September 12
- Peak intensity: 100 mph (155 km/h) (1-min); 960 mbar (hPa)

An area of unsettled weather developed between the Bahamas and Bermuda on September 6, and over the next few days convection increased in intensity and coverage. On September 8, the system organized sufficiently to be declared a subtropical depression about 425 mi (685 km) southwest of Bermuda; later that day, the system was named Subtropical Storm Gustav. After attaining tropical characteristics on September 10, Gustav passed slightly east of the Outer Banks of North Carolina as a tropical storm before turning northeastward. Gustav intensified into a hurricane on September 11 and briefly became a Category 2 hurricane, peaking with winds of 100 mph (155 km/h), before striking Atlantic Canada twice as a Category 1 hurricane on September 12. At the first landfall, Gustav's barometric pressure was 960 mbar (28 inHg). Gustav became extratropical over Newfoundland around 12:00 UTC that day, though the remnants meandered over the Labrador Sea before dissipating on September 15.

The storm was responsible $100,000 in damage to vehicles and property in North Carolina, where about 40 people had to be rescue from rough seas at Hatteras alone. The interaction between Gustav and a non-tropical system produced strong winds that caused an additional $240,000 in damage in New England, but this damage was not directly attributed to the hurricane. Gustav drowned one person in South Carolina, while Gustav and the non-tropical system killed three other people, two in New Jersey and one in New York. In Atlantic Canada, the hurricane and its remnants brought heavy rain, tropical storm and hurricane-force winds, as well as storm surges for several days. Localized flooding was reported in areas of Prince Edward Island, and 4,000 people in Halifax, Nova Scotia, and Charlottetown, Prince Edward Island were left without power.

=== Tropical Storm Hanna ===
- Tropical storm (SSHWS)
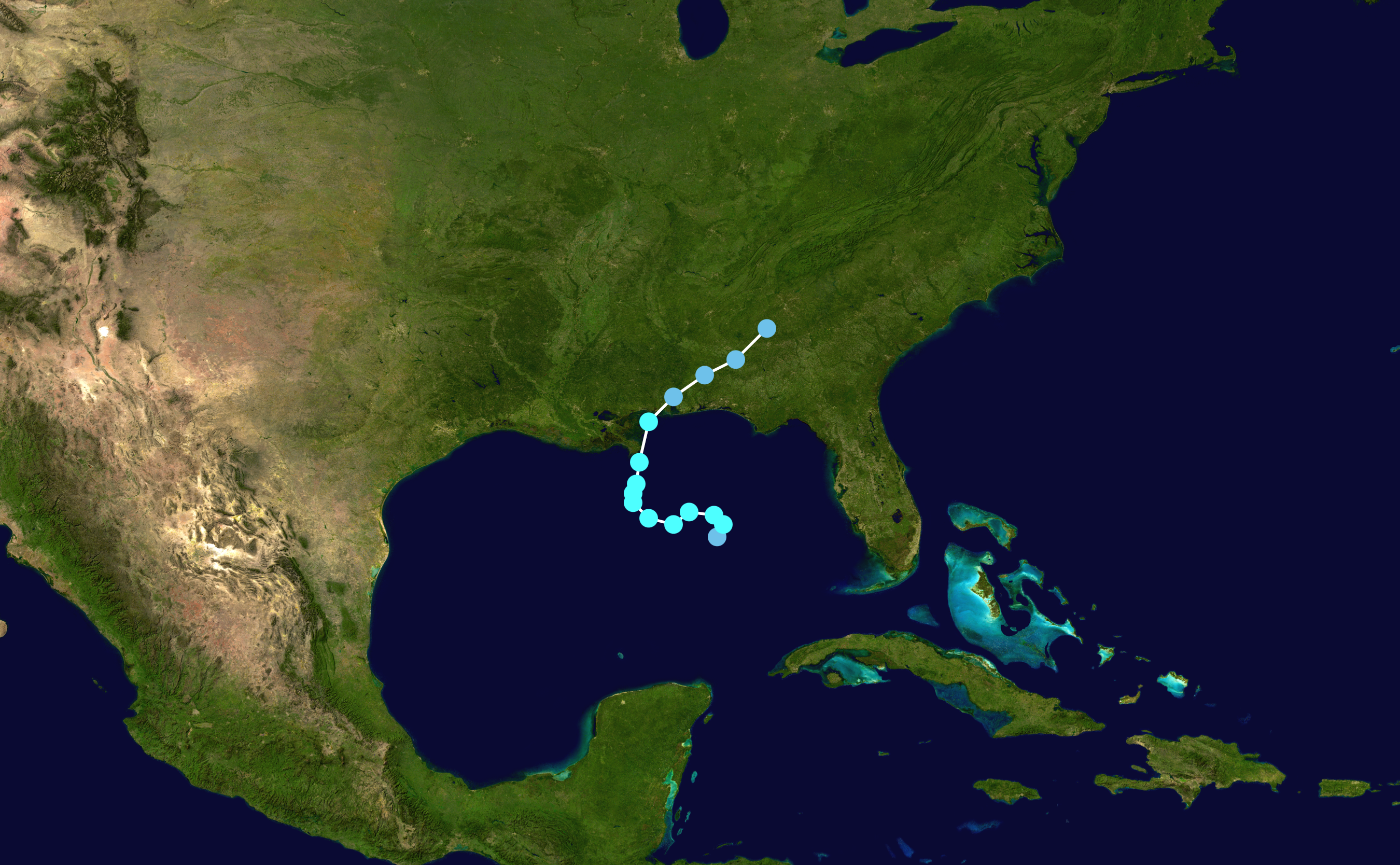
- Duration: September 12 – September 15
- Peak intensity: 60 mph (95 km/h) (1-min); 1001 mbar (hPa)

In early September, a tropical wave merged with a trough of low pressure in the Gulf of Mexico and spawned a low-pressure system. Convection steadily deepened on September 11 east of the upper-level low and the surface low; it was classified as Tropical Depression Nine the next day roughly 290 mi (465 km) south of Pensacola, Florida. The disorganized storm moved westward, then northward, where it strengthened into Tropical Storm Hanna later on September 12. After reaching a peak with winds of 60 mph (95 km/h) and a minimum pressure of 1,001 mbar (29.6 inHg) on September 14, Hanna made two landfalls on the Gulf Coast, first over far eastern Louisiana and then just west of the Mississippi-Alabama state line. Hanna weakened to a tropical depression late that day and then dissipated over Georgia on September 15.

Because most of the associated convective activity was east of the center of circulation, minimal damage was reported in Louisiana and Mississippi. To the east on Dauphin Island, Alabama, the storm caused coastal flooding which closed roads and forced the evacuation of residents. Portions of Florida received high wind gusts, heavy rainfall, and strong surf that resulted in the deaths of three swimmers. Throughout the state, 20,000 homes lost electricity. The heavy rainfall progressed into Georgia, where significant flooding occurred. Crop damage was extensive, and over 300 structures were damaged by the flooding. Overall, Hanna caused a total of about $20 million in damage and three fatalities.

=== Hurricane Isidore ===
- Category 3 hurricane (SSHWS)
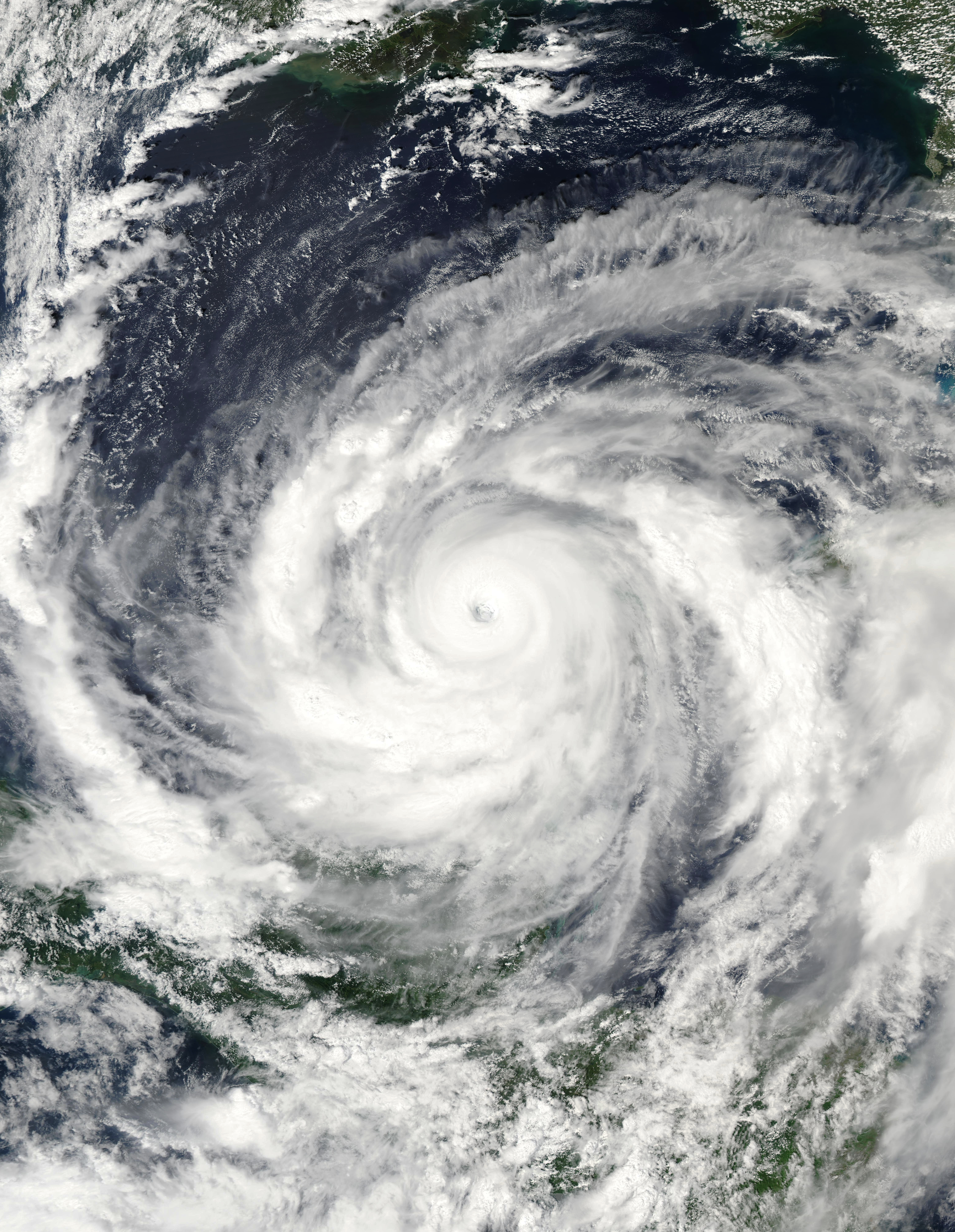
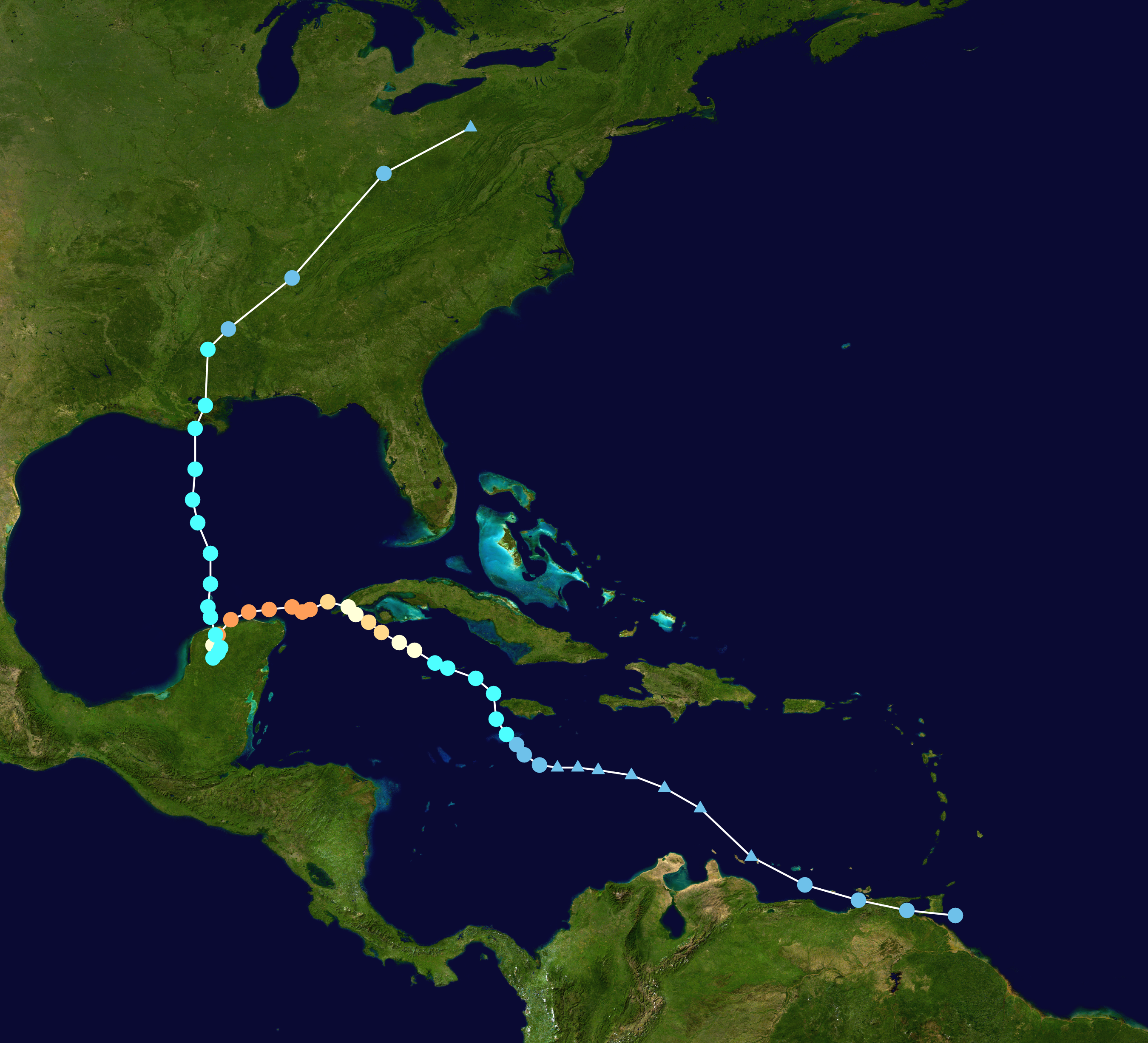
- Duration: September 14 – September 27
- Peak intensity: 125 mph (205 km/h) (1-min); 934 mbar (hPa)

On September 9, a tropical wave moved off the coast of Africa, and by late September 14 it was classified as a tropical depression just east of Trinidad. Because the depression crossed Trinidad and Venezuela, it degenerated into a tropical wave near the ABC islands about 24 hours later. However, the remnants reorganized into a tropical depression about 140 mi (225 km) south of Jamaica on September 17. The depression intensified into Tropical Storm Isidore early the next day. Turning west-northwestward on September 18, Isidore strengthened into a hurricane on September 19 and briefly reached Category 2 intensity. However, Isidore weakened to a Category 1 storm before striking western Cuba near Cabo Frances. Isidore then moved in a more westward direction and reached its peak intensity as a Category 3 hurricane with winds of 125 mph (205 km/h) and a minimum pressure of 934 mbar (27.6 inHg) around 12:00 UTC on September 22.

The hurricane then curved southwestward and made landfall late on September 22 near Telchac Puerto, Yucatán. Isidore slowly executed a small cyclonic loop over the Yucatán Peninsula and weakened to a tropical storm on the next day. Although Isidore emerged into the Gulf of Mexico near where it made landfall, the storm would not be able to reorganize significantly while trekking generally northward. Around 06:00 UTC on September 26, Isidore struck near Grand Isle, Louisiana, with winds of 65 mph (100 km/h). After moving inland, the storm weakened to a tropical depression early the next day and headed rapidly north-northeastward to northeastward, several hours before becoming extratropical over Pennsylvania on September 27. The extratropical remnants were soon absorbed by a frontal zone.

Heavy rains fell on Jamaica, peaking at 27.2 in (690 mm) at Cotton Tree Gully, flooding some homes in Saint Catherine Parish and inundating roads across the island. In Cuba, rainfall and storm surge demolished 77 houses, caused power outages, felled trees, and deroofed structures. Isidore also killed thousands of livestock, ruined coffee and tobacco crops, and damaged more than 130 tobacco drying houses. In Mexico, Isidore produced intense winds and rainfall exceeding 30 in (760 mm) in some places. Consequently, the storm damaged approximately 83,000 homes and destroyed almost 36,500 others, leaving 300,000-500,000 people homeless. Roughly $950 million in damage and 17 deaths occurred in Mexico. Rainfall from Isidore in the United States peaked at 15.97 in (406 mm) in Metairie, Louisiana. Flooding due to rainfall, storm surge, and overflowing rivers damaged about 1,000 homes in St. Tammany Parish and 200 to 300 homes and businesses in Terrebonne Parish. In Mississippi, flooding damaged about 1,400 homes and 300 businesses in Harrison County, while 2,500 residences in Hancock County and 50 businesses and homes in Jackson County suffered damage. Overall, Isidore caused about $330 million in damage and five deaths in the country, four directly and one indirectly.

=== Tropical Storm Josephine ===
- Tropical storm (SSHWS)
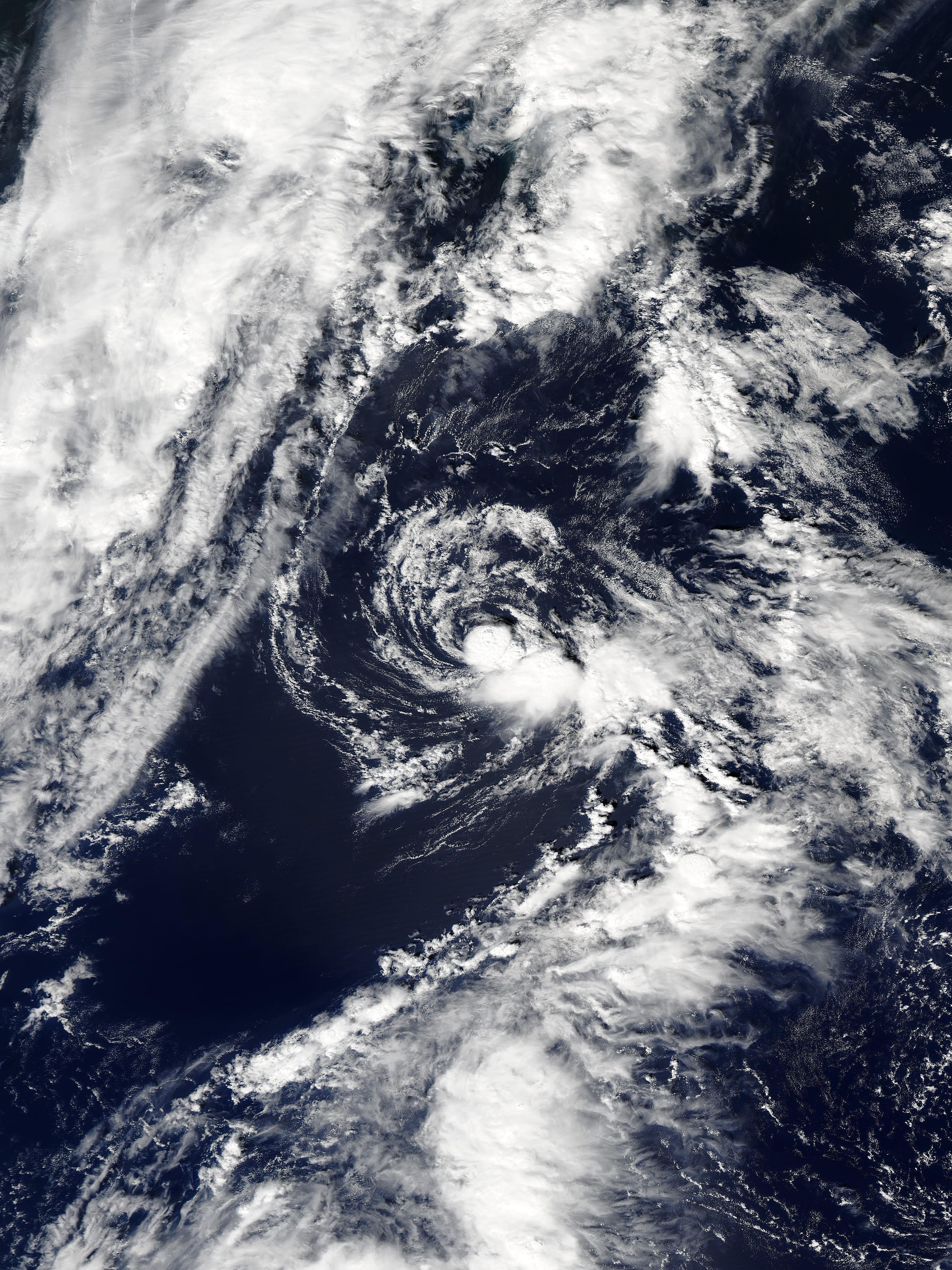
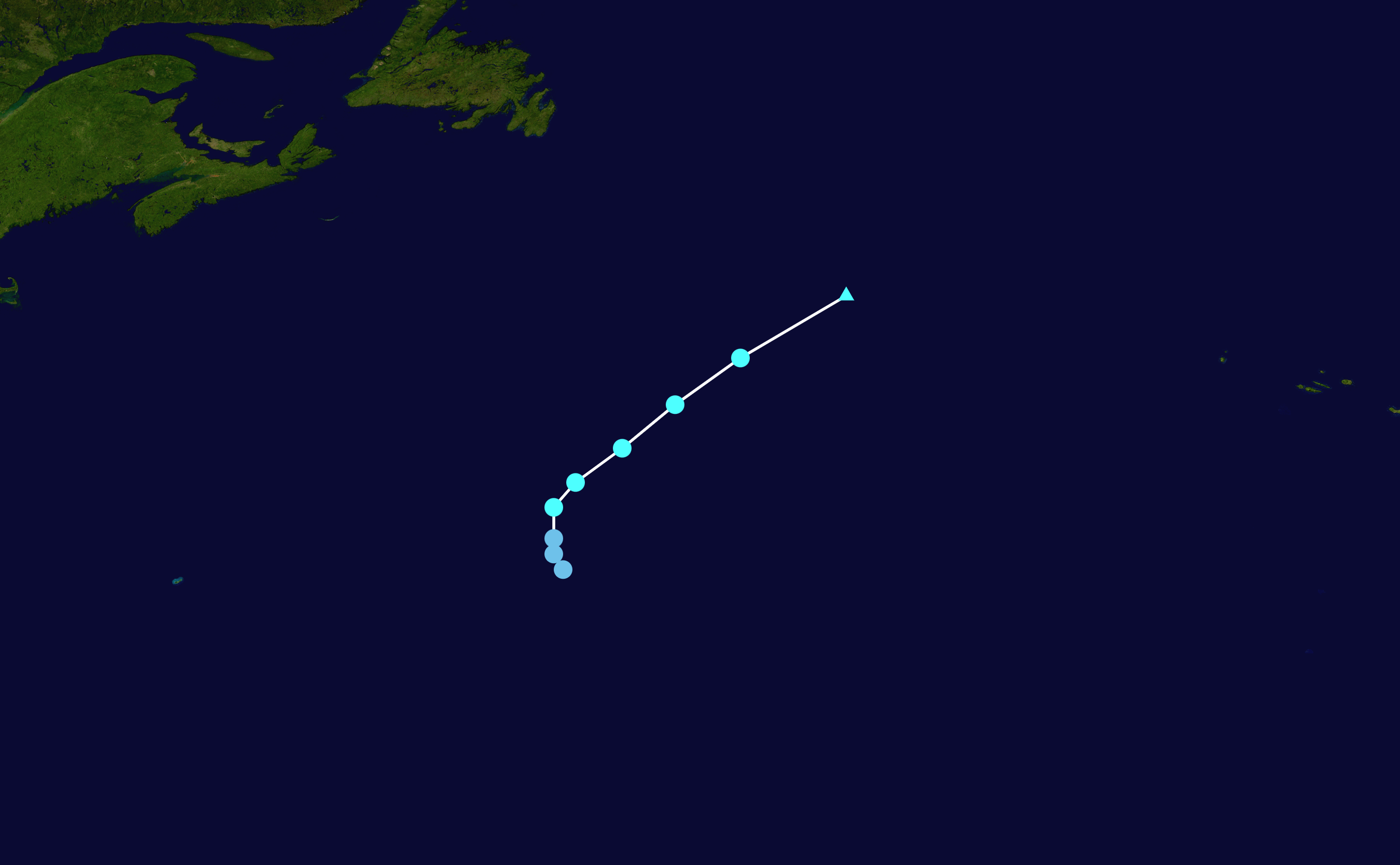
- Duration: September 17 – September 19
- Peak intensity: 40 mph (65 km/h) (1-min); 1009 mbar (hPa)

A non-tropical low developed along a dissipating stationary front on September 16 in the central Atlantic and drifted north-northeastward. The National Hurricane Center classified it as Tropical Depression Eleven on September 17 about 710 mi (1,145 km) east of Bermuda, and initially the depression did not have significant deep convection. A wind report early on September 18 indicated the depression intensified into Tropical Storm Josephine. The storm continued generally northeastward, steered between a subtropical high to the northeast and a frontal system approaching from the west. Josephine maintained a well-defined circulation, but its deep convection remained intermittent. Early on September 19, the storm began being absorbed by the cold front, and as a tropical cyclone, its winds never surpassed 40 mph (65 km/h) or its atmospheric pressure decreased below 1,009 mbar (29.8 inHg). Later that day, Josephine transitioned into an extratropical cyclone about 600 mi (965 km) southeast of Cape Race, Newfoundland, and suddenly intensified to winds of 60 mph (95 km/h). The extratropical low was quickly absorbed by another larger extratropical system late on September 19.

=== Hurricane Kyle ===
- Category 1 hurricane (SSHWS)
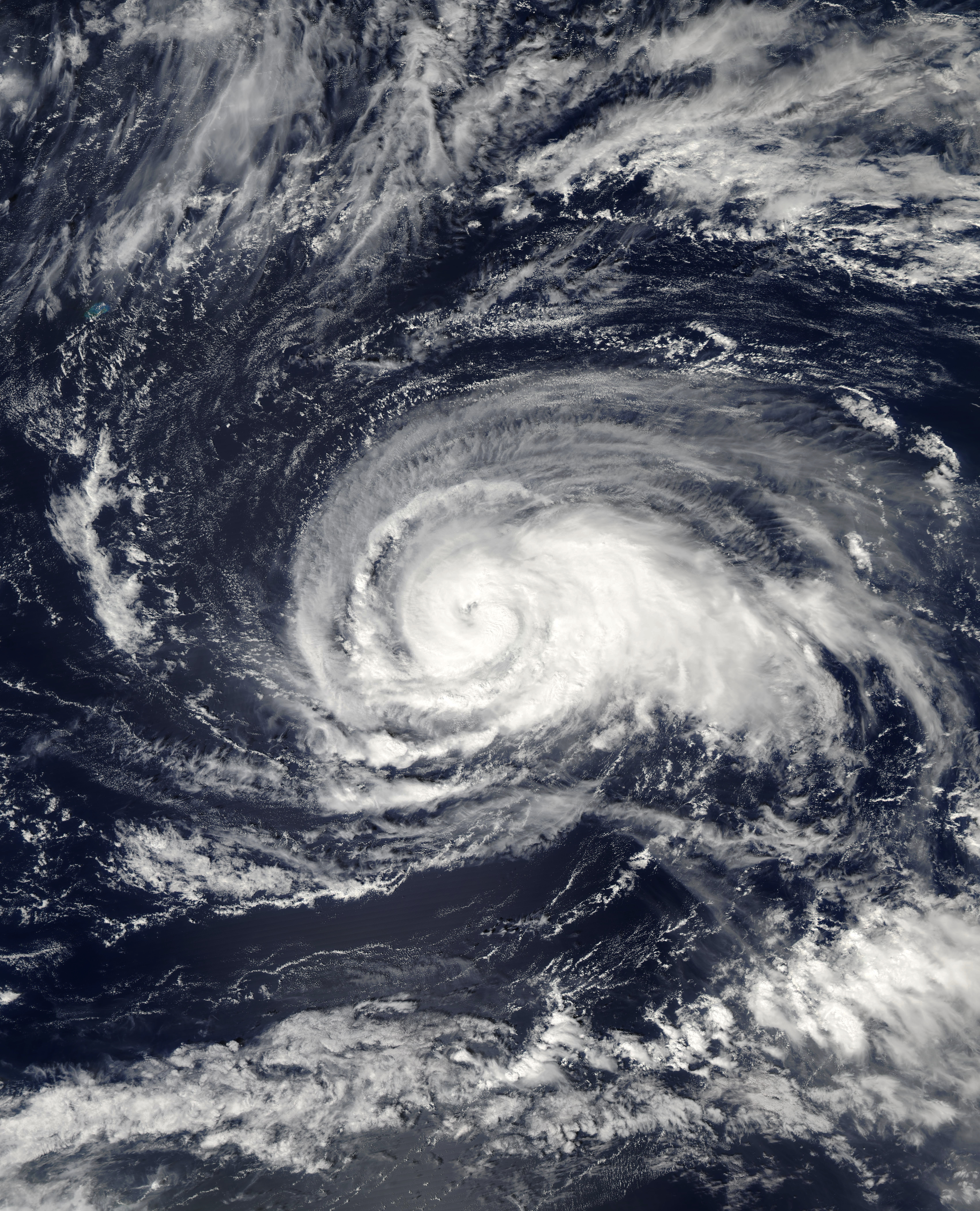
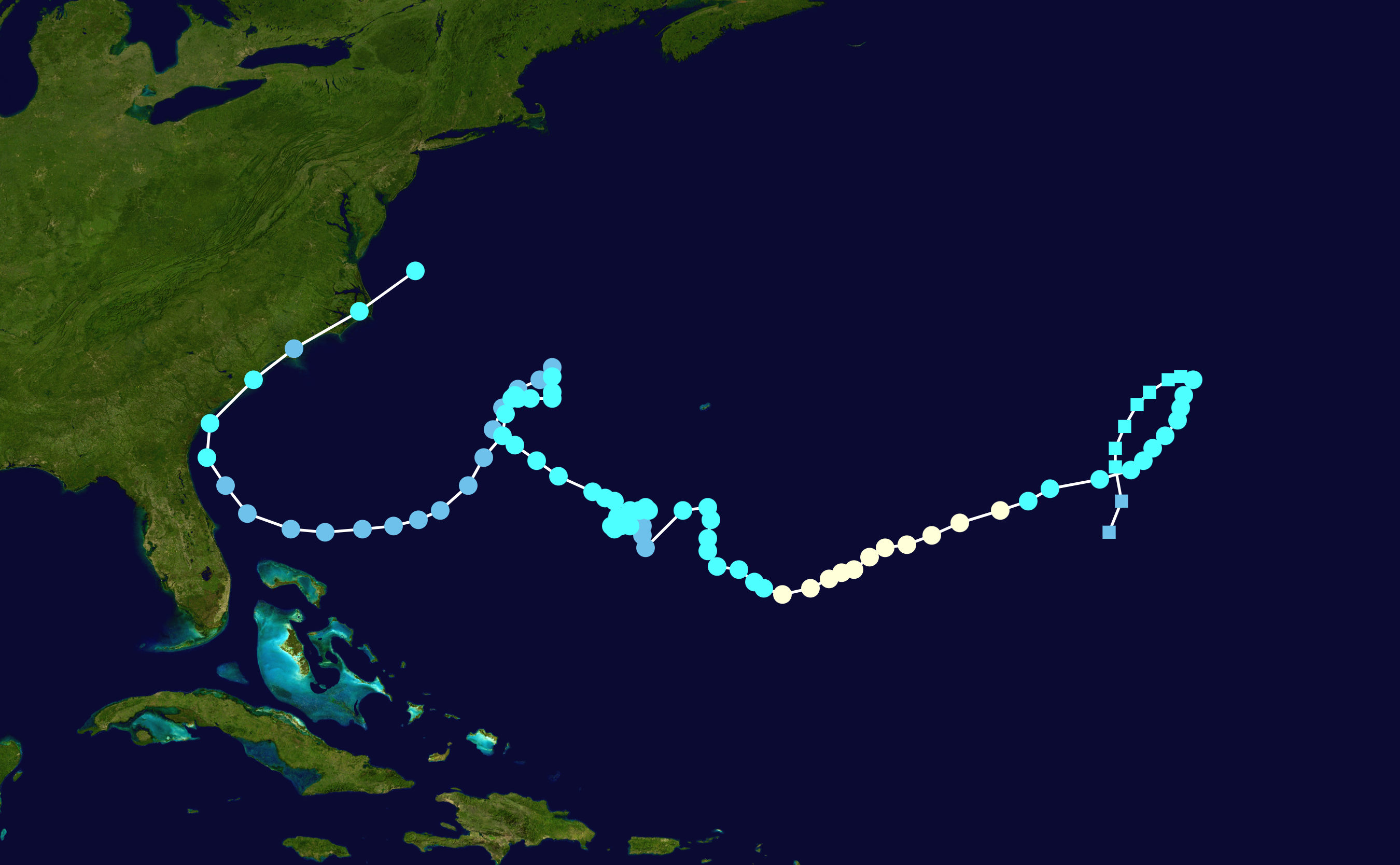
- Duration: September 20 – October 12
- Peak intensity: 85 mph (140 km/h) (1-min); 980 mbar (hPa)

A non-tropical low formed into Subtropical Depression Twelve about 825 mi (1,330 km) east-southeast of Bermuda on September 20. It became Subtropical Storm Kyle the next day, and Tropical Storm Kyle on September 22. Kyle drifted slowly westward, slowly strengthening, and reached hurricane strength on September 25. Peaking with winds of 85 mph (140 km/h) and a minimum pressure of 980 mbar (29 inHg) on September 27, Kyle weakened to a tropical storm on the following day. The cyclone's strength continued to fluctuate between tropical depression and tropical storm several times. Its movement was also extremely irregular, as it shifted sharply north and south along its generally westward path. On October 11, Kyle made landfall near McClellanville, South Carolina. While skirting the coastline of the Carolinas, it moved back over water, and made a second landfall near Long Beach, North Carolina, later the same day. Kyle continued out to sea and merged with a cold front on October 12 about 320 mi (515 km) south-southwest of Nantucket, Massachusetts, becoming the fourth longest-lived Atlantic hurricane.

Kyle brought light precipitation to Bermuda. Moderate rainfall accompanied its two landfalls in the United States, causing localized flash flooding and road closures. In South Carolina, floodwaters forced the evacuation of a nursing home and several mobile homes, with 17 severely damaged in Manning. Kyle spawned at least four tornadoes in the United States, the costliest of which struck Georgetown, South Carolina; it damaged 106 buildings and destroyed seven others, causing eight injuries. The cyclone also brought rainfall to the Mid-Atlantic region, though it was mainly beneficial due to drought conditions. Overall damage totaled about $5 million. Additionally, the remnants of Kyle contributed to one indirect death in the British Isles.

=== Hurricane Lili ===
- Category 4 hurricane (SSHWS)
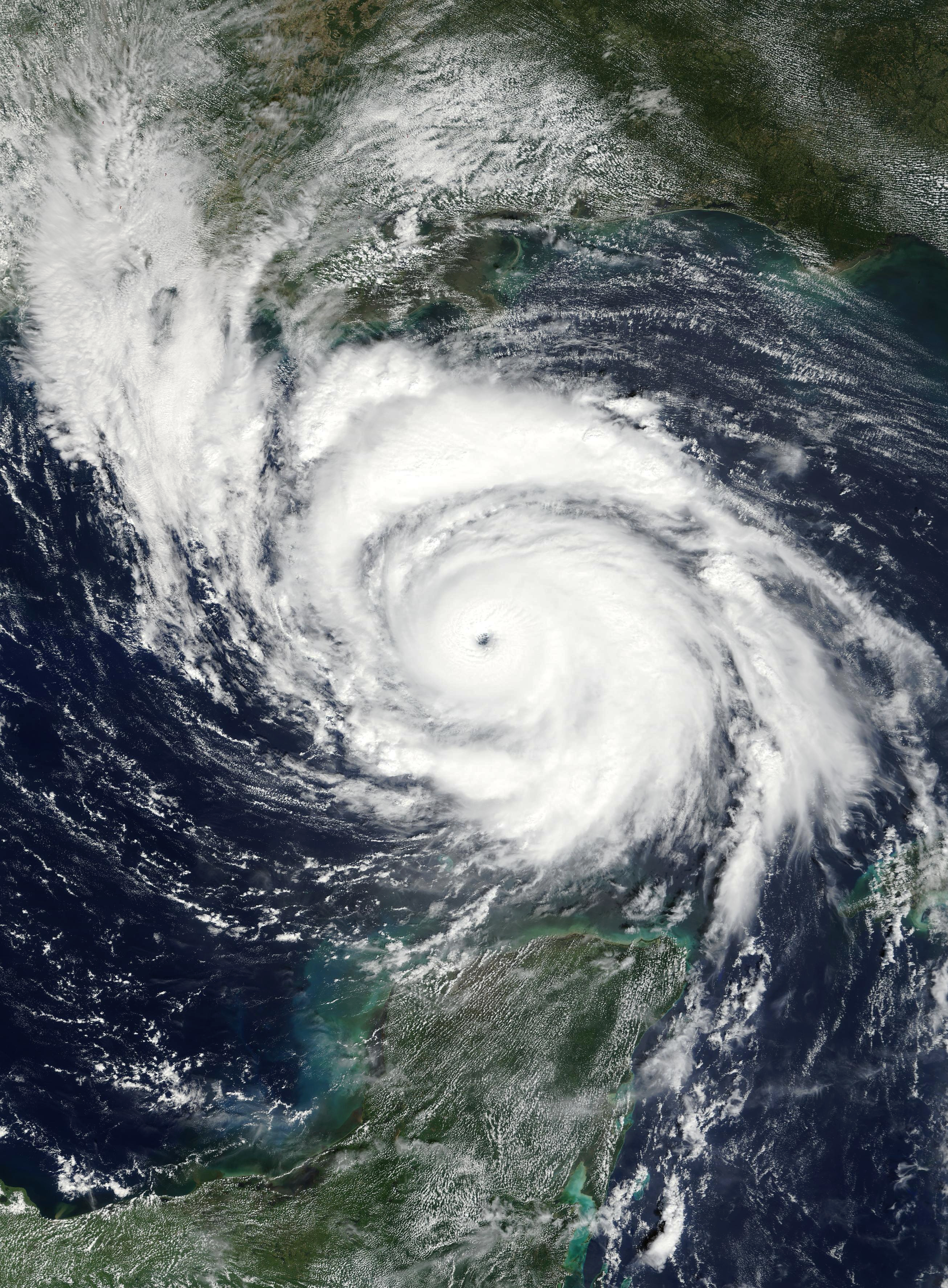
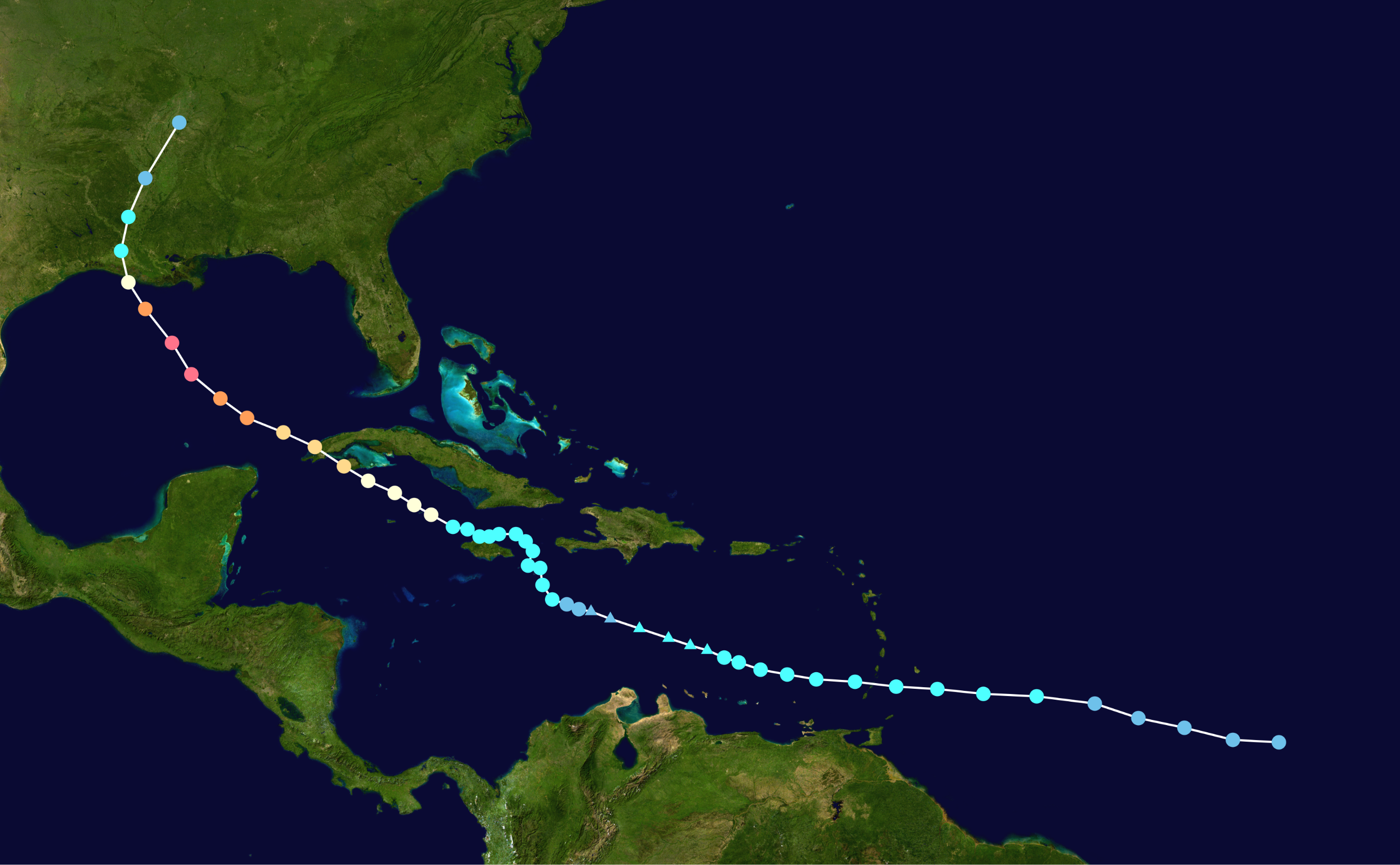
- Duration: September 21 – October 4
- Peak intensity: 145 mph (230 km/h) (1-min); 938 mbar (hPa)

On September 16, a tropical wave moved off the coast of Africa, and crossed the Atlantic, organizing into a tropical depression about 1,035 mi (1,665 km) east of the Windward Islands on September 21. The depression intensified into Tropical Storm Lili on September 23, several hours before crossing the islands. After nearly reaching hurricane status over the eastern Caribbean, the storm degenerated into a tropical wave on September 25 north of the ABC islands, before becoming a tropical depression again early on September 27 about halfway between Haiti and Colombia. The cyclone re-intensified into a tropical storm several hours later. On September 30, Lili became a hurricane while passing over the Cayman Islands. After striking Cuba's Isla de la Juventud and Pinar del Río Province as a Category 2 on October 1, the storm attained Category 4 status in the Gulf of Mexico, peaking with winds of 145 mph (230 km/h) and a minimum pressure of 938 mbar (27.7 inHg) late on October 2. However, Lili rapidly weakened to a Category 1 hurricane on the following day before striking near Intracoastal City, Louisiana. On October 4, Lili was absorbed by an extratropical low near the Tennessee – Arkansas border.

Rains and gusty winds in the Windward Islands damaged hundreds of buildings, knocked out utility services, and ruined banana crops, especially on Saint Lucia, which lost at least half of its crop. Saint Vincent and the Grenadines, Saint Lucia, and Barbados reported approximately $14.8 million, $7.4 million, and $100,000 in damage, respectively, while four people died due to a landslide on Saint Vincent. In Haiti, heavy rains caused mudslides and flooding, leading to four deaths and substantially damaging crops and infrastructure, with more than 1,700 homes damaged and 240 others destroyed. Similarly, immense precipitation on Jamaica led to floods and mudslides that killed four people and damaged infrastructure, including all hospitals on the island. Strong winds and rainfall in Cuba damaged over 50,000 homes and compounded losses to tobacco and rice crops that were impacted by Isidore. Wind gusts reaching 120 mph (190 km/h), coupled with over 6 in (150 mm) of rainfall and a storm surge of 12 ft (3.7 m), lashed the south coast of Louisiana. In Vermilion Parish, the storm damaged almost 4,000 homes and thousands of others in neighboring Acadia Parish. A total of 237,000 people lost power, and oil rigs offshore were shut down for up to a week. At least $30 million in damage occurred in Mississippi. Lili caused about $1.1 billion in damage and at least two indirect deaths in the United States.

=== Tropical Depression Fourteen ===
- Tropical depression (SSHWS)
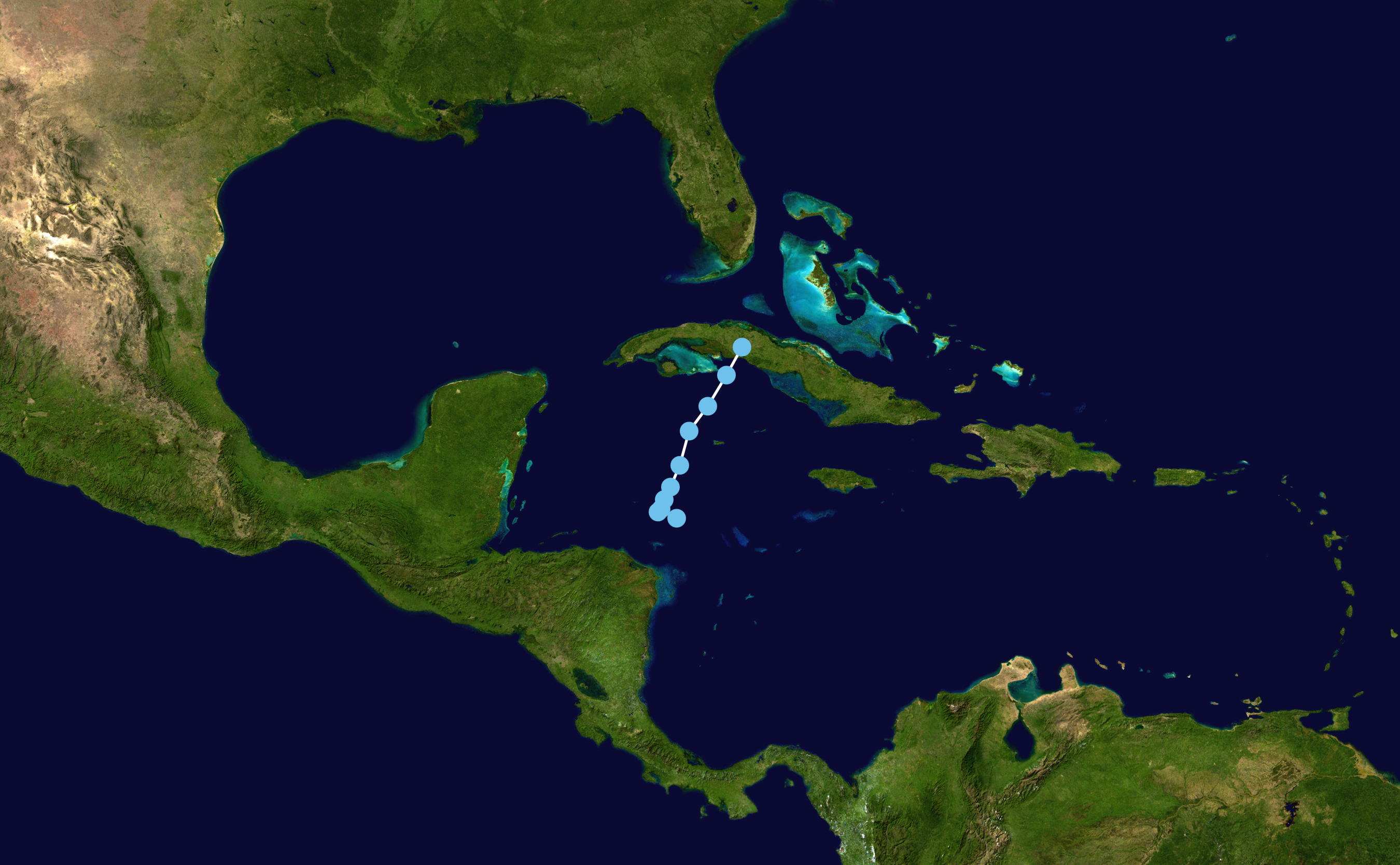
- Duration: October 14 – October 16
- Peak intensity: 35 mph (55 km/h) (1-min); 1002 mbar (hPa)

A weak tropical wave moved through the Lesser Antilles on October 9. As the system reached the southwestern Caribbean on October 12, convection increased, and a broad low-pressure area formed later that day. Over the next two days, the low significantly organized, and became Tropical Depression Fourteen at 12:00 UTC on October 14 roughly 140 mi (225 km) north-northeast of Cabo Gracias a Dios, located at the Honduras–Nicaragua border. The depression initially tracked west-northwestward, but then curved north-northeastward. Vertical wind shear prevented the depression from intensifying beyond winds of 35 mph (55 km/h) and a minimum pressure of 1,002 mbar (29.6 inHg). By 16:00 UTC on October 16, the depression struck near Cienfuegos, Cuba, with winds of 30 mph (50 km/h). While crossing the island, the depression was absorbed by a cold front early on October 17. Locally heavy rains affected portions of Jamaica, Cuba, and the Cayman Islands.

== Storm names ==
The following list of names was used for named storms that formed in the North Atlantic in 2002. This was the same list used in the 1996 season, with the exception of the names Cristobal, Fay and Hanna, which replaced Cesar, Fran and Hortense respectively. Each of the three new names was used for the first time in 2002.

- Arthur
- Bertha
- Cristobal
- Dolly
- Edouard
- Fay
- Gustav
- Hanna
- Isidore
- Josephine
- Kyle
- Lili
- Marco (unused)
- Nana (unused)
- Omar (unused)
- Paloma (unused)
- Rene (unused)
- Sally (unused)
- Teddy (unused)
- Vicky (unused)
- Wilfred (unused)

Beginning in 2002, subtropical cyclones were numbered and named following the same procedure as tropical cyclones. Gustav was the first subtropical system to be named under the new policy.

=== Retirement ===
In the spring of 2003, the World Meteorological Organization retired the names Isidore and Lili from its rotating Atlantic hurricane name lists due to the damage each caused, and they will never be used again in the Atlantic basin. Those names were replaced with Ike and Laura (Note: The name Laura was used only once under previous naming convention in 1971.) for the 2008 season.

== Season effects ==
This is a table of all of the storms that formed in the 2002 Atlantic hurricane season. It includes their name, duration, peak classification and intensities, areas affected, damage, and death totals. Deaths in parentheses are additional and indirect (an example of an indirect death would be a traffic accident), but were still related to that storm. Damage and deaths include totals while the storm was extratropical, a wave, or a low, and all of the damage figures are in 2002 USD.

Saffir–Simpson scale
TD	TS	C1	C2	C3	C4	C5

2002 North Atlantic tropical cyclone season statistics
Storm name	Dates active	Storm category at peak intensity	Max 1-min wind mph (km/h)	Min. press. (mbar)	Areas affected	Damage (US$)	Deaths	Ref(s).
Arthur	July 14–16	Tropical storm	60 (95)	997	Southeastern United States	Minimal	1	
Bertha	August 4–9	Tropical storm	40 (65)	1007	Mississippi	$200,000	1	
Cristobal	August 5–8	Tropical storm	50 (85)	999	Bermuda, New York	Minimal	0 (3)	
Dolly	August 29 – September 4	Tropical storm	60 (95)	997	None	None	None	
Edouard	September 1–6	Tropical storm	65 (100)	1002	Florida	Minimal	None	
Fay	September 5–8	Tropical storm	60 (95)	998	Texas, Northern Mexico	$5 million	None	
Seven	September 7–8	Tropical depression	35 (55)	1013	None	None	None	
Gustav	September 8–12	Category 2 hurricane	100 (155)	960	North Carolina, Virginia, New Jersey, New England	$340,000	1 (3)	
Hanna	September 12–15	Tropical storm	60 (95)	1001	Florida, Louisiana, Alabama, Mississippi, Georgia, Southeastern U.S., Mid Atlantic	$20 million	3	
Isidore	September 14–27	Category 3 hurricane	125 (205)	934	Venezuela, Jamaica, Cayman Islands, Cuba, Yucatán Peninsula, Louisiana, Mississippi	$1.28 billion	19 (3)	
Josephine	September 17–19	Tropical storm	40 (65)	1006	None	None	None	
Kyle	September 20 – October 12	Category 1 hurricane	85 (140)	980	Bermuda, Florida, Georgia, South Carolina, North Carolina, British Isles	$5 million	0 (1)	
Lili	September 21 – October 4	Category 4 hurricane	145 (230)	938	Windward Islands, Haiti, Cuba, Cayman Islands, Louisiana	$1.12 billion	13 (2)	
Fourteen	October 14–16	Tropical depression	35 (55)	1002	Jamaica, Cayman Islands, Cuba	Minimal	None	
Season aggregates
14 systems	July 14 – October 16		145 (230)	934		$2.433 billion	38 (12)	

== See also ==
- Tropical cyclones in 2002
- 2002 Pacific hurricane season
- 2002 Pacific typhoon season
- 2002 North Indian Ocean cyclone season
- South-West Indian Ocean cyclone seasons: 2001–02, 2002–03
- Australian region cyclone seasons: 2001–02, 2002–03
- South Pacific cyclone seasons: 2001–02, 2002–03
- South Atlantic tropical cyclone
- Mediterranean tropical-like cyclone
