= Tropical Storm Fay (2002) =

Atlantic tropical storm in 2002

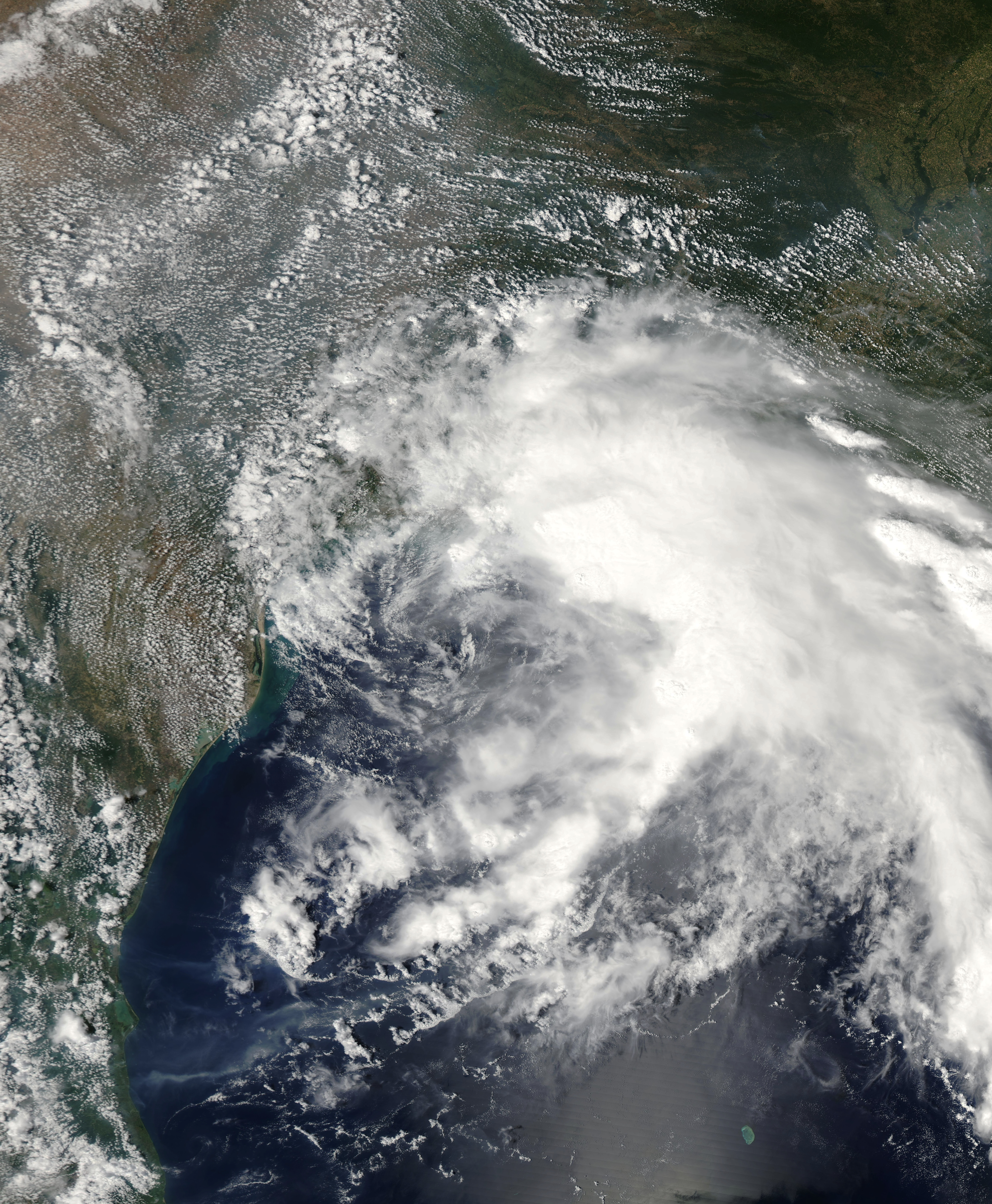
- Tropical Storm Fay near peak intensity on September 6

Meteorological history
- Formed: September 5, 2002
- Remnant low: September 8, 2002
- Dissipated: September 11, 2002

Tropical storm
- 1-minute sustained (SSHWS/NWS)
- Highest winds: 60 mph (95 km/h)
- Lowest pressure: 998 mbar (hPa); 29.47 inHg

Overall effects
- Fatalities: None
- Damage: $4.5 million (2002 USD)
- Areas affected: Texas, northern Mexico
- IBTrACS
- Part of the 2002 Atlantic hurricane season

Tropical Storm Fay was the sixth named storm of the 2002 Atlantic hurricane season; it was a moderate tropical storm which caused flooding in parts of Texas and Northern Mexico. It formed from a trough of low pressure that moved south into the Gulf of Mexico, and became stationary. A low pressure center developed along this trough, and on September 5, a Hurricane Hunter aircraft reported that the system had gained sufficient organization to be classified a tropical depression, 95 miles (153 km) southeast of Galveston. The depression drifted south-southwest while strengthening, reaching its peak strength of 60 miles per hour (97 km/h) on the morning of September 6. The system then made an abrupt turn to the west-northwest, and remained steady in strength and course until landfall the next day, near Matagorda. The system weakened rapidly after landfall degenerating into a remnant low on September 8, but the storm's circulation survived for another three days.

The storm caused extremely heavy rainfall in inland areas; damage reached $4.5 million (2002 USD), though there were no fatalities due to Fay.

== Meteorological history ==
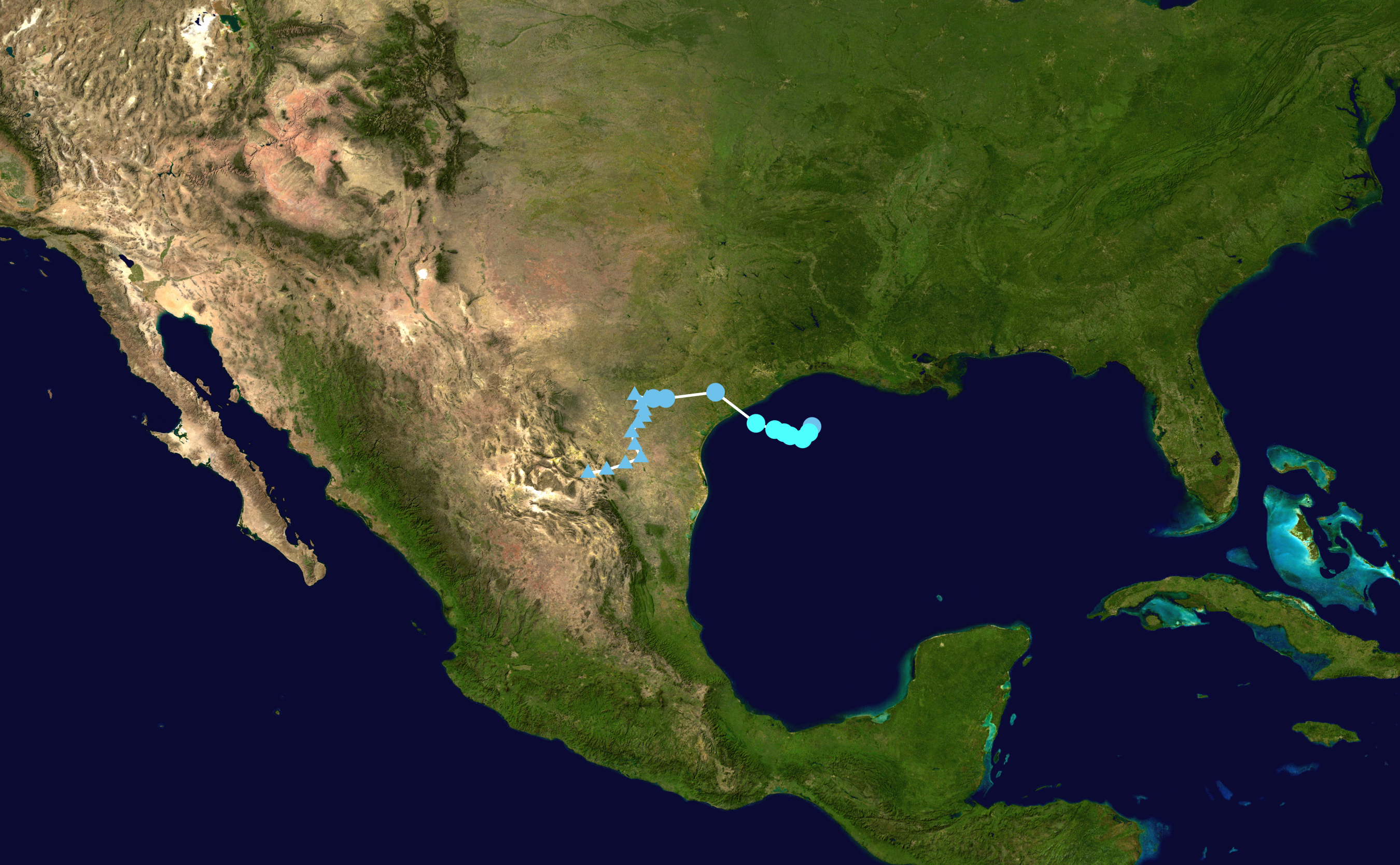
Map plotting the storm's track and intensity, according to the Saffir–Simpson scale Map key Saffir–Simpson scale Tropical depression (≤38 mph, ≤62 km/h) Tropical storm (39–73 mph, 63–118 km/h) Category 1 (74–95 mph, 119–153 km/h) Category 2 (96–110 mph, 154–177 km/h) Category 3 (111–129 mph, 178–208 km/h) Category 4 (130–156 mph, 209–251 km/h) Category 5 (≥157 mph, ≥252 km/h) Unknown Storm type Tropical cyclone Subtropical cyclone Extratropical cyclone, remnant low, tropical disturbance, or monsoon depression

In the first few days of September 2002, an upper-level trough emerged in the Gulf of Mexico and stalled. Thunderstorms developed along the trough and concentrated around a weak low pressure system. Slowly, the trough and associated low pressure drifted south into the warm waters of the Gulf of Mexico. A low pressure area in the northwest Gulf of Mexico became the dominant circulation and slowly developed persistent convection near the center. On September 5, a reconnaissance aircraft investigated the system. During the flight, a low-level center became evident and some deep convection persisted; as a result, it was classified as a tropical depression. Wind shear within the Gulf of Mexico was weak and remained favorable to tropical cyclone formation. A reconnaissance flight later that day discovered an ill-defined circulation which led to low confidence of the location of the center of circulation. However, enough convection persisted for the depression to be upgraded into Tropical Storm Fay that evening.

Stationary in movement, the associated convection became removed from the center of circulation; despite this, the system gradually intensified. On September 6, the storm reached its peak intensity of 60 mph (100 km/h). Light wind shear prevented Fay from intensifying further, and the gradual movement was dictated by a weak mid-level ridge to the north. A low pressure system to the south of Fay produced wind shear and resulted in decreased convection on the southern half of the circulation, with the majority of convective activity located on the northern half. Fay soon became disorganized which prompted National Hurricane Center forecaster Avila to state, "[Fay] rather resembles a subtropical storm". Fay moved little, and intensified slightly late on September 6.

On September 7, Fay began to drift northwest towards the Texas coast as its rainbands reached the northwest portion of the Texas coastline. Fay accelerated towards the Texas coast and made landfall early that day. The storm meandered throughout inland Texas, and as the system moved inland, forward speed decreased and Fay weakened to a tropical depression. The last advisory was issued on Fay later on the same day, and the storm degenerated into a remnant low on September 8, although the depression's remnants persisted for a few more days just inland of the Texas Coast. On September 11, Fay's remnants dissipated to the northwest of Monterrey, Mexico.

== Preparations ==
Coinciding with the development of the tropical depression, forecasters issued a tropical storm warning for parts of the Texas coast. When the depression was upgraded into Tropical Storm Fay, the warnings were extended from Matagorda, Texas to coastal Louisiana. On September 8, forecasters extended the warnings to Port Aransas, Texas, and areas from Port O'Connor to High Island, Texas were put under a hurricane watch as the storm was forecast to reach hurricane strength before making landfall. However, the hurricane watch for those areas were discontinued when Fay failed to reach hurricane strength. In addition, coastal Texas as well as coastal Louisiana were under a coastal flood warning, while parts of inland Texas were under flash flood warnings and flood warnings.

Schools closed in Galveston and High Island on September 6 in anticipation of the storm, and voluntary evacuation orders were put into effect along low-lying coastal areas. Some grocery stores in Angleton reported supply shortages.

== Impact ==
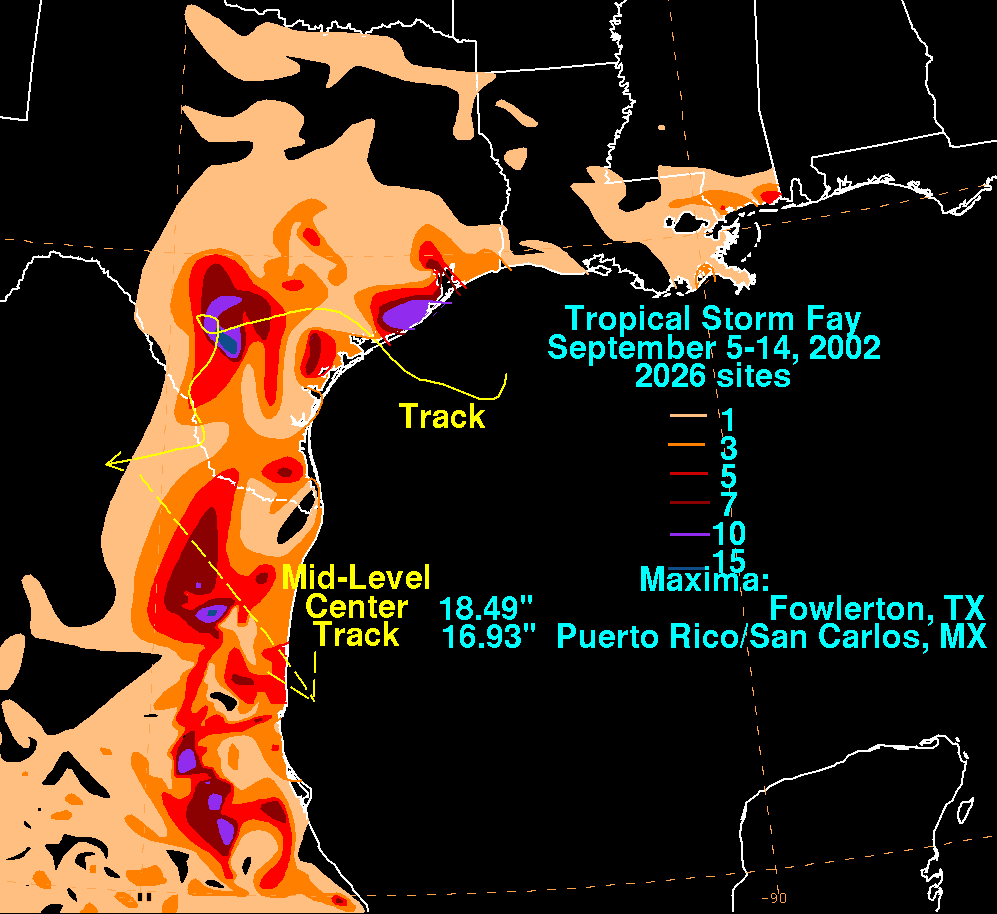
Rainfall totals from Tropical Storm Fay

In Louisiana and Mississippi, effects were minor, and limited to moderate rain up to three inches (76 mm).

The effects in Texas were moderate to severe in some locations, with flooding being the main source of damage. In total, 400 houses sustained damage from flooding. Along the coast, a waterspout spawned by Fay made landfall, and caused minor damage along the northern end of Galveston Island. Storm surge along the Texas coast was 4.5 feet (1.1 m) above the normal high tide. Peak rainfall throughout the area was in the range of 10-15 inches (250–380 mm). Severe damage resulted from Fay in Sweeny, where about 1,000 homes and businesses were damaged by the storm, and there was $3.5 million (2002 USD) in damage. Rainfall totals up to 24 inches (600 mm) caused severe flash flooding there, and in areas near there. Another area that received severe damage from Fay was Matagorda County, where flooding from the storm left $1.3 million (2002 USD) in damage to roads and public facilities.

Twelve tornadoes were reported during Fay's landfall. The most notable one destroyed a mobile home, and damaged a barn. Heavy rain from Fay's remnants also dropped 2–3 inches (50–75 mm) of rain over Frio County. Rainfall of 8 inches (200 mm) was reported near the Atascosca County line with an isolated report of 12 inches (300 mm) in other areas. The rainfall caused severe flashflooding which forced people to flee to roof tops. Damage to buildings, roads and crops totaled up to $800,000 (2002 USD).

In Mexico, effects were mostly related to rainfall. Up to 16 inches (400 mm) of rain fell in some areas. When Fay flooded areas such as Nuevo Laredo, Tamaulipas, 100 families were evacuated from their homes, and 120 people were stranded in hotels. It was reported that 10 trees fell in Nuevo Laredo, but causing little or no damage. Also, the Rio Grande flooded its banks to 3.3 meters (10 ft) above flood stage. 300 families were reported to be not able to return to their homes for several weeks as a result of the flooding.

== Aftermath ==
Nine counties in Texas were declared disaster areas after Tropical Storm Fay: Brazoria, Frio, Galveston, La Salle, Live Oak, Matagorda, Nueces, San Patricio and Wharton. The declaration enabled business owners and residents to apply for federal and state government aid programs. Disaster housing checks handed out after the storm totaled to over $2.7 million (2002 USD) and the Federal Emergency Management Agency (FEMA) had carried out over 2,700 home and building inspections. Non-government relief programs such as The Individual and Family Grant Program had distributed over $400,000 (2002 USD) in checks, and over $1 million (2002 USD) in relief funds. The Small Business Administration also funded over $250,000 (2002 USD) in relief aid. After Tropical Storm Fay, the Internal Revenue Service (IRS) announced that they would apply special tax relief for the nine counties in Texas that were declared disaster areas.

== See also ==
- List of Texas hurricanes
- Other storms of the same name
