= List of storms named Fay =

The name Fay or Faye has been used for 24 tropical cyclones worldwide: 6 in the Atlantic Ocean; 1 in the Australian region; 1 in the South Pacific Ocean; and 16 in the Western Pacific Ocean.

In the Atlantic:

- Hurricane Faye (1975), a Category 2 hurricane that had minor effects in Bermuda
- Tropical Storm Fay (2002), a tropical storm that caused minor damage in Texas and northern Mexico
- Tropical Storm Fay (2008), a near-hurricane strength tropical storm that made landfall in Florida four times, the first known storm in history to do so
- Hurricane Fay (2014), a Category 1 hurricane that affected Bermuda
- Tropical Storm Fay (2020), a moderate tropical storm that affected New Jersey, earliest sixth named storm in the Atlantic basin
- Tropical Storm Fay (2026), a strong and long-lived tropical storm that took an erratic path and did not affect land

In the Australian region:

- Cyclone Fay (2004), a Category 5 storm (Category 4 on the Saffir-Simpson scale) that made landfall in Western Australia; name retired afterward

In the South Pacific:

- Cyclone Fay (1978), affected Fiji; no fatalities reported

In the Western Pacific:

- Typhoon Faye (1949)
- Tropical Storm Faye (1952)
- Typhoon Faye (1957)
- Typhoon Faye (1960)
- Typhoon Faye (1963), a Category 3 typhoon that made landfall in Hong Kong; 3 fatalities were reported
- Typhoon Faye (1965), a Category 4 super typhoon that stayed at sea
- Typhoon Faye (1968)
- Typhoon Faye (1971)
- Tropical Storm Faye (1974)
- Typhoon Faye (1978)
- Tropical Storm Faye (1979)
- Typhoon Faye (1982)
- Typhoon Faye (1985)
- Tropical Storm Faye (1989)
- Tropical Storm Faye (1992)
- Typhoon Faye (1995)
