= Bayou Dupre =

Coordinates: 29.9349°N 89.8368°W

Bayou Dupre is a bayou in southeastern Louisiana.
