= Instituto de Meteorologia =

Instituto de Meteorologia can refer to:

- Instituto Português do Mar e da Atmosfera (formerly "Instituto de Meteorologia")
- Instituto de Meteorología de Cuba
