= Tropical Storm Edouard (2026) =

Atlantic tropical storm in 2026

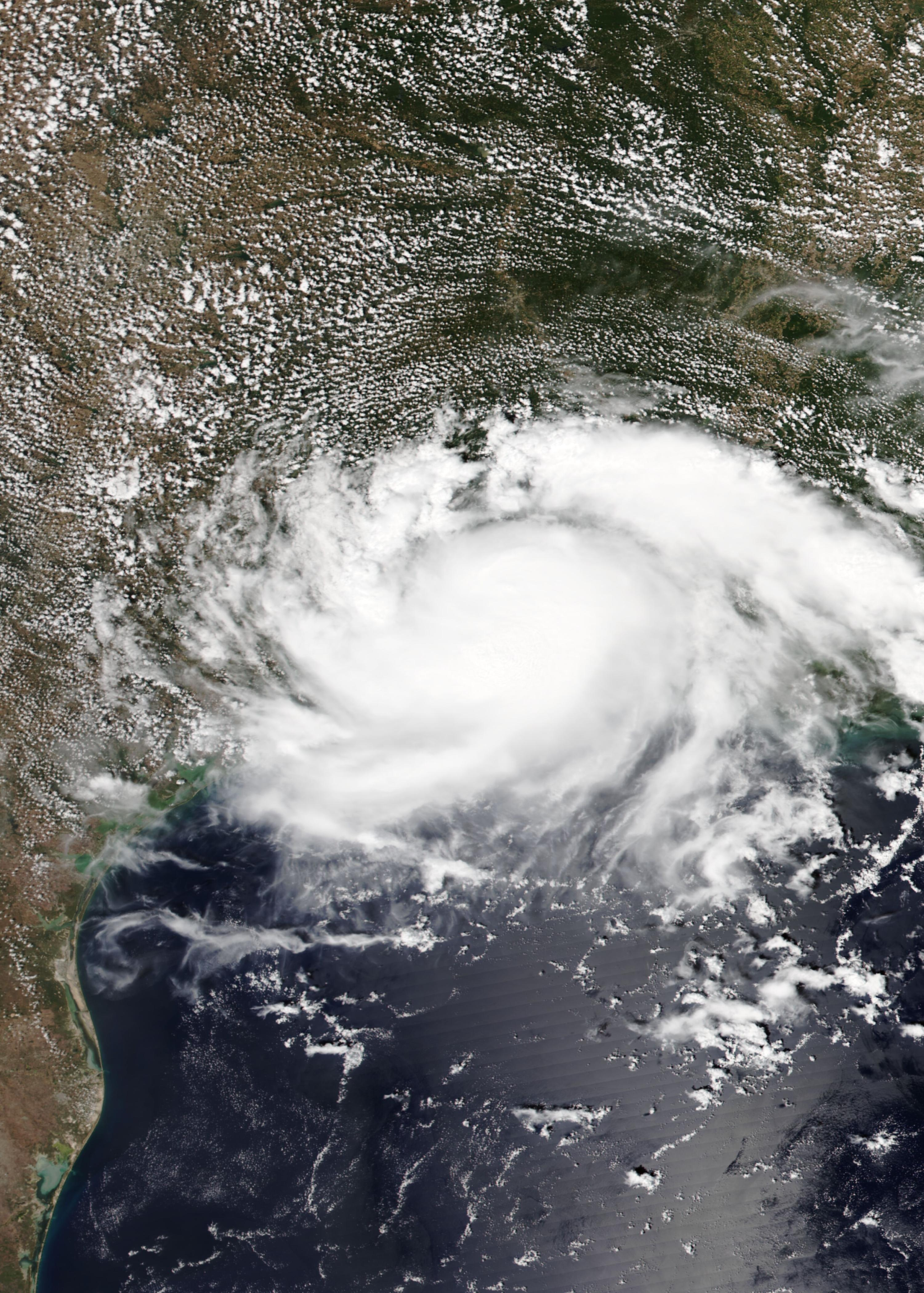
- Edouard making landfall in Louisiana at peak intensity on September 1

Meteorological history
- Formed: August 31, 2026
- Dissipated: September 3, 2026

Tropical storm
- 1-minute sustained (SSHWS/NWS)
- Highest winds: 60 mph (95 km/h)
- Lowest pressure: 996 mbar (hPa); 29.41 inHg

Overall effects
- Fatalities: None
- Damage: >$140 million (2026 USD)
- Areas affected: Gulf Coast of the United States
- IBTrACS
- Part of the 2026 Atlantic hurricane season

Tropical Storm Edouard was a compact tropical cyclone that struck the Gulf Coast of the United States. The fifth named storm of the 2026 Atlantic hurricane season, Edouard formed from a non-tropical low pressure area in the northern Gulf of Mexico on August 31. Initially struggling to organize, Edouard quickly intensified to its peak intensity with maximum sustained winds of 60 mph (97 km/h) as it made landfall near Johnson Bayou, Louisiana, on the afternoon of September 1. Edouard quickly degraded to a tropical depression once inland.

Edouard brought strong winds to southeast Texas, with a maximum wind gust of 90 mph (140 km/h) measured in Port Arthur. Strong winds downed several trees and caused power outages. As the storm moved inland, it dropped torrential rainfall totals exceeding 20 in (510 mm) over southeast Texas, peaking in Hardin, Polk, and Tyler counties where a flash flood emergency was declared. On September 4, an initial estimate by the reinsurer Aon plc placed losses in the tens of millions of US dollars.

== Meteorological history ==
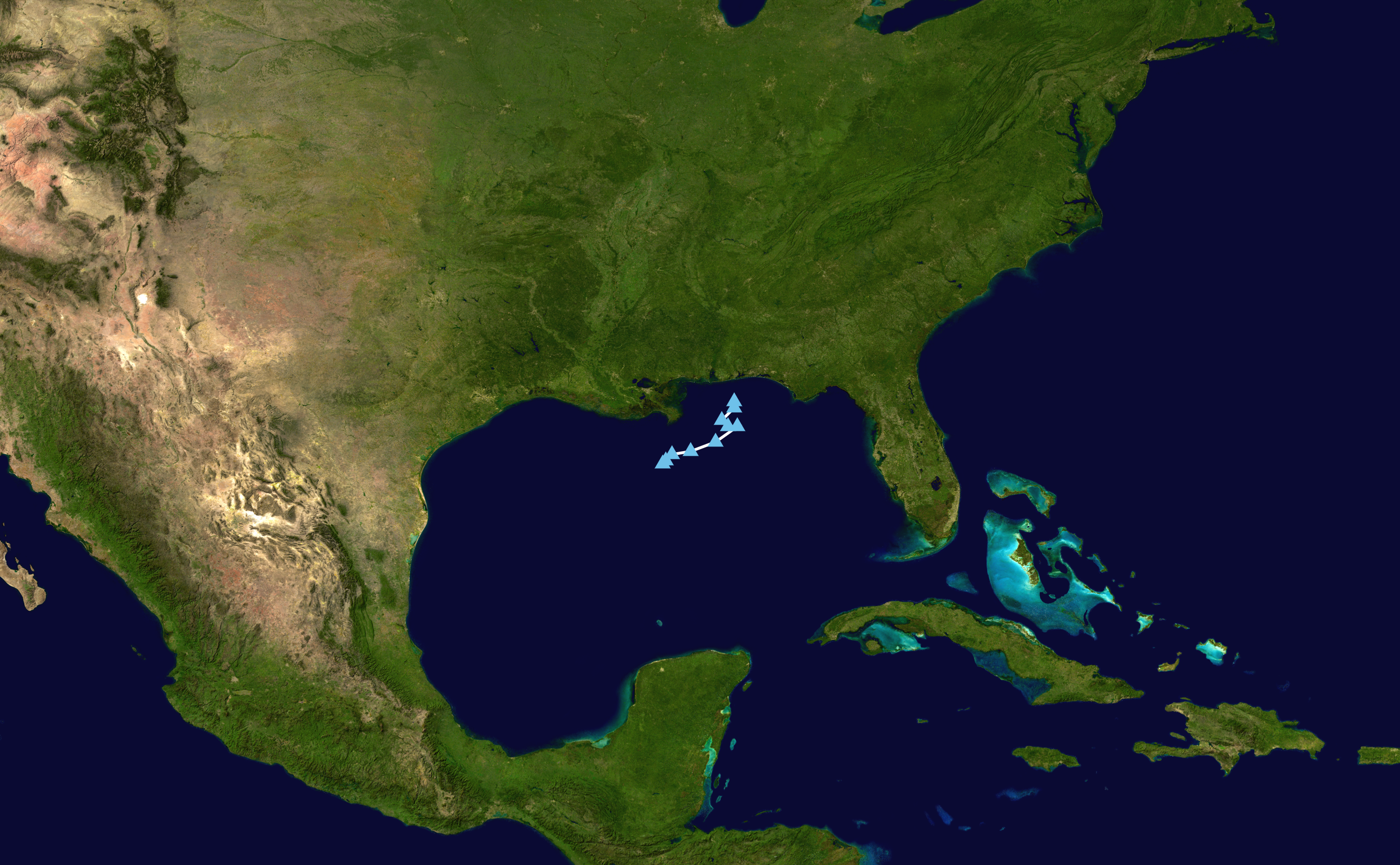
Map plotting the storm's track and intensity, according to the Saffir–Simpson scale Map key Saffir–Simpson scale Tropical depression (≤38 mph, ≤62 km/h) Tropical storm (39–73 mph, 63–118 km/h) Category 1 (74–95 mph, 119–153 km/h) Category 2 (96–110 mph, 154–177 km/h) Category 3 (111–129 mph, 178–208 km/h) Category 4 (130–156 mph, 209–251 km/h) Category 5 (≥157 mph, ≥252 km/h) Unknown Storm type Tropical cyclone Subtropical cyclone Extratropical cyclone, remnant low, tropical disturbance, or monsoon depression

At 00:00 UTC on August 29, the National Hurricane Center (NHC) began monitoring a nearly-stationary area of low pressure and associated weak convection over the northern Gulf of Mexico for a low chance of tropical cyclogenesis. Chances for tropical cyclogenesis began to increase the following day as satellite data indicated that the low was becoming better organized. At 15:00 UTC on August 31, the disturbance organized sufficiently to be designated as a tropical depression. Steered to the west-northwest by a mid-level ridge over the Southeastern United States, the system gradually intensified, being upgraded to Tropical Storm Edouard at 00:00 UTC on September 1, as it developed banding features. Although shortly thereafter, the storm underwent a lull in organization despite being located in a favorable environment consisting of low wind shear, moist air, and very warm sea surface temperatures.

Edouard resumed organization into the morning hours of September 1, beginning to form a well-defined core with signs of a low-level eyewall based on radar imagery. Edouard continued to steadily intensify, reaching its peak intensity with maximum sustained winds of 60 mph (97 km/h) and a minimum barometric pressure of 996 mbar (29.4 inHg) as it moved ashore near Johnson Bayou, Louisiana, at 19:25 UTC that day. Edouard weakened once inland, falling to tropical depression intensity at 03:00 UTC the next day. Despite weakening, the system's structure still remained well-organized. A few hours later, the NHC passed advisory responsibilities to the Weather Prediction Center (WPC). At 09:00 UTC on September 3, the WPC ceased advisories on Edouard as it degenerated into a remnant low.

== Preparations ==
Upon designation as a potential tropical cyclone, a tropical storm warning was issued between Port Bolivar, Texas, and the Vermillion–Cameron parish line in Louisiana. A few hours later, the tropical storm warning was extended eastward to the Vermillion–Iberia Parish border. A storm surge watch was also issued between Cameron–Vermillion Parish line and High Island, Texas. A hurricane watch was issued early on September 1 from High Island, Texas to Cameron, Louisiana, while the storm surge watch was upgraded to a storm surge warning. Both the hurricane watch and storm surge warnings were discontinued by 18:00 UTC that day as Edouard failed to attain hurricane intensity. Flood watches were also issued for southeast Texas.

CenterPoint Energy activated emergency operations and deployed personnel to prepare for potential power outages. Several school districts in southeast Texas and in Cameron Parish, Louisiana were closed due to the storm. Texas Governor Greg Abbott activated the state emergency response, deploying rescue equipment and 1,500 state personnel while also opening the state's emergency response center. Local states of emergencies were issued in Port Arthur as well as Chambers, Jasper, and Orange counties. Four sandbag filling sites were opened in Orange County. Drainage Districts 6 and 7 in Jefferson County, Texas, cleared ditches and prepared drainage equipment for the storm. The Galveston County Sheriff's office dispatched additional officers to the Bolivar Peninsula for the duration of the storm. The American Red Cross opened a shelter in a gymnasium. Amtrak cancelled the Sunset Limited between Houston and New Orleans in both directions, and replaced them with a bus bridge due to the storm.

== Impact ==
Radar loop of Tropical Storm Edouard at landfall in Louisiana on September 1

=== Louisiana ===
In Louisiana, a maximum sustained wind of 41 mph (66 km/h) was recorded at Calcasieu Pass while a maximum wind gust of 67 mph (108 km/h) was recorded at Holly Beach. Rainfall from Edouard affected areas as far east as Lafayette. A storm surge of 2.3 ft (0.70 m) was recorded at Freshwater Canal Locks near Pecan Island. Storm surge flooding inundated LA 82 in rural Cameron Parish. A large tree was blown onto a road near Merryville.

=== Texas ===
Strong winds affected southeast Texas, with a maximum sustained wind of 57 mph (92 km/h) being measured by a National Ocean Service station near Texas Point and a maximum wind gust of 90 mph (140 km/h) observed in Port Arthur. Over 82,000 customers in Texas were left without electricity during the storm. Due to power outages, several school districts extended their class cancellations. Power outages also affected operations at the Medical Center of Southeast Texas. Strong winds downed several trees and electrical lines in Taylor Landing. The Rainbow Bridge was closed for several hours due to high winds. A widespread gas odor occurred in Port Arthur as Edouard impacted the area, though the exact cause is under investigation. Heavy rainfall totals were observed across southeast Texas from Edouard, reaching over 20 inches (510 mm) in parts of Hardin and Tyler counties, where a flash flood emergency was issued. Several creeks rose in the towns of Bevil Oaks, Silsbee, and Sour Lake. Multiple vehicles were stranded after roads were flooded in Beaumont and Kountze. FM 787 was inundated by one foot (0.30 m) of water in Saratoga resulting in several stalled vehicles. Several other roads, including US 59, was also inundated. More than 20 roads in Livingston were left impassable by floodwaters. The overflow of Choates Creek in Livingston required the rescue of five people, including four children, from a flooded mobile home. Another 21 people had to be evacuated from a flooded assisted living facility in Hardin County and 12 motorists were rescued from flooded streets. Ten structures were damaged by fallen trees. Entergy reported that 198 power poles and 81 transformers were damaged. An athletic complex in Beaumont was damaged by Edouard.

Further west, only minor impacts were observed in Galveston County with most of the county receiving only around 0.25 in (6.4 mm) of rainfall, though higher totals near 2 in (51 mm) were recorded on the Bolivar Peninsula. Heavy rainfall that was forecast for Greater Houston generally did not occur due to Edouard making landfall further east than anticipated, however, several inches of rainfall still occurred in a swath from central Montgomery to Liberty County to the north of Houston.

Following Edouard, Texas Agriculture Commissioner Sid Miller issued an agricultural emergency for affected areas. In Houston, water coming from the city's system was reported discolored with a greenish hue. Beaumont's council approved $75,000 of funds to be dedicated towards cleaning up physical debris after the storm.

== See also ==
- Weather of 2026
- Tropical cyclones in 2026
- Other storms of the same name
- List of Texas hurricanes
- List of Louisiana hurricanes
