= 2026 Atlantic hurricane season =

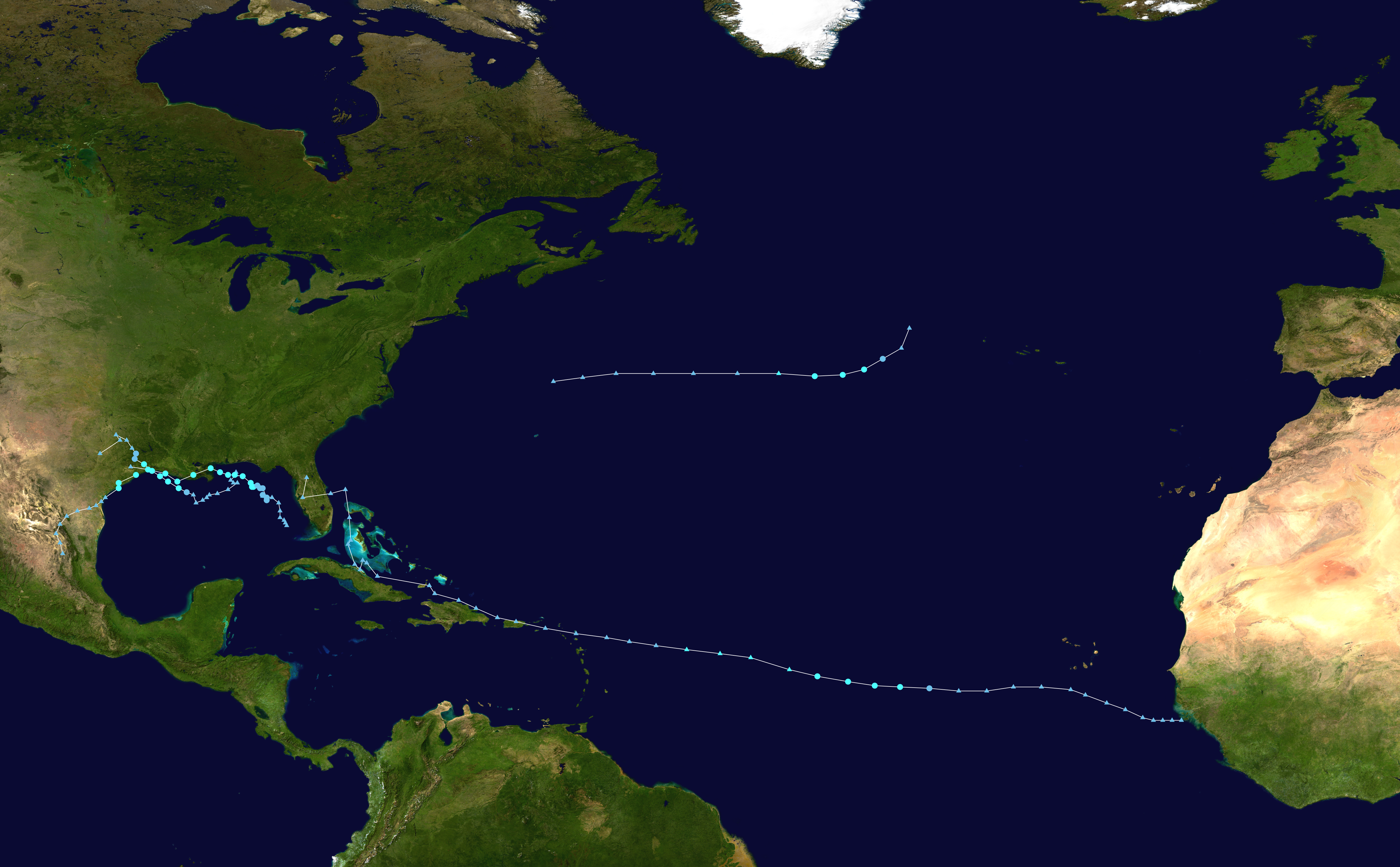
- Season summary map

Seasonal boundaries
- First system formed: June 17, 2026
- Last system dissipated: Season ongoing

Strongest storm
- Name: Isaias
  - Maximum winds: 120 mph (195 km/h) (1-minute sustained)
  - Lowest pressure: 958 mbar (hPa; 28.29 inHg)

Seasonal statistics
- Total depressions: 10
- Total storms: 10
- Hurricanes: 1
- Major hurricanes (Cat. 3+): 1
- ACE: 19.9
- Total fatalities: 12
- Total damage: > $3.24 billion (2026 USD)

Related articles
- 2026 Pacific hurricane season; 2026 Pacific typhoon season; 2026 North Indian Ocean cyclone season

The 2026 Atlantic hurricane season is the current annual cycle of tropical cyclone formation in the North Atlantic basin. The season officially began on June 1, 2026, and will end on November 30, 2026. These dates, adopted by convention, historically describe the period in each year when most subtropical or tropical cyclogenesis occurs in the Atlantic Ocean (over 97%). The first system, Tropical Storm Arthur, formed on June 17 and impacted much of the northwestern coast of the Gulf of Mexico. A little over a month later, Tropical Storm Bertha formed on the opposite side of the gulf, impacting nearly the entire United States's Gulf Coast along its path. In September, Tropical Storm Edouard made landfall close to the Texas–Louisiana border.

When Hurricane Isaias strengthened into the season's first hurricane on October 8, the season tied the 1905 season for having the latest date for formation of the season's first hurricane, as no hurricanes formed during the 1907 and 1914 seasons.

== Seasonal forecasts ==
Predictions of tropical activity in the 2026 season
Source	Date	Named storms	Hurricanes	Major hurricanes	Ref
Average (1991–2020)		14.4	7.2	3.2
Record high activity		30	15	7†
Record low activity		1	0†	0†
TSR	December 11, 2025	14	7	3
UA	April 7, 2026	20	9	4
CSU	April 9, 2026	13	6	2
TSR	April 9, 2026	12	5	1
TWC	April 16, 2026	12	6	2
UPenn	April 21, 2026	7–13	N/A	N/A
NCSU	April 22, 2026	12–15	6–9	2–3
SMN	April 22, 2026	11–15	4–7	1–2
INSMET	May 5, 2026	11	5	2
NOAA	May 21, 2026	8–14	3–6	1–3
UKMO*	May 28, 2026	9	5	2
CSU	June 10, 2026	11	5	2
UA	June 14, 2026	13	5	3
CSU	July 8, 2026	9	4	1
NOAA	August 6, 2026	7–13	2–6	0–2
	Actual activity	10	1	1
* June–November only † Most recent of several such occurrences. (See all)

In advance of, and during, each hurricane season, several forecasts of hurricane activity are issued by national meteorological services, scientific agencies, and noted hurricane experts. These include forecasters from the United States National Oceanic and Atmospheric Administration (NOAA)'s Climate Prediction Center, Tropical Storm Risk (TSR), the United Kingdom's Met Office (UKMO), and Colorado State University (CSU). The forecasts include weekly and monthly changes in significant factors that help determine the amount of tropical storms, hurricanes, and major hurricanes within a particular season.

According to NOAA and CSU, the average hurricane season between 1991 and 2020 contained about fourteen named storms, seven hurricanes, and three major hurricanes (Category 3 and higher), as well as a median accumulated cyclone energy (ACE) index of 71.04–123.14 units. Broadly speaking, ACE is the measure of the power of a tropical or subtropical cyclone multiplied by the length of time it existed. ACE is only calculated for full advisories on specific tropical or subtropical cyclones reaching wind speeds of 39 mph (63 km/h) or higher. NOAA typically describes a season as above-average, average, or below-average depending on the cumulative ACE index, but the number of tropical storms, hurricanes or major hurricanes can also be considered.

=== Pre-season forecasts ===
On December 11, 2025, TSR released its first forecast for the season, expecting a near-normal season, with fourteen named storms, seven hurricanes, three major hurricanes, (Note: Hurricanes reaching Category 3 and higher—1-minute sustained winds higher than 110 miles per hour (178 km/h)—on the Saffir–Simpson scale are described as major hurricanes.) and an ACE index of 125 units, close to the thirty-year average. TSR noted historically low certainty in this forecast, with the main factors being potentially moderate El Niño conditions arising in mid- to late-summer 2026, along with a reasonable certainty of warmer-than-average sea surface temperatures (SSTs) for the season.

On April 7, 2026, the University of Arizona (UA) posted its forecast calling for an active season featuring twenty named storms, nine hurricanes, four major hurricanes, and an ACE index of 155 units. Noted in its forecast were similarities to the 2023 season, namely the possibility of exceptionally strong El Niño conditions for the season, along with the 2026 SST outlook being only slightly lower than that of 2023. Two days later, CSU and TSR published their April forecasts, both calling for a slightly below-normal season. CSU forecasted thirteen named storms, six hurricanes, and two major hurricanes with an ACE index of 90 units, while TSR forecasted twelve named storms, five hurricanes, and one major hurricane with an ACE index of 66 units. This is due to the likelihood of robust El Niño conditions during the season, which will likely induce above-normal wind shear across the Tropical Atlantic and Caribbean, despite some predictions calling for slightly above-average SSTs in the Atlantic. On April 16, The Weather Channel (TWC) issued its forecast, also calling for a below-average season with twelve named storms, six hurricanes, and two major hurricanes due to the predicted El Niño. On April 21, University of Pennsylvania (UPenn) issued its prediction of 7–13 systems with a best estimate of 10 systems. On April 22, North Carolina State University (NCSU) released its seasonal forecast, calling for an average season of 12–15 named storms, 6–9 hurricanes, and 2–3 major hurricanes while also forecasting near-average activity in the Gulf of Mexico and below-average activity in the Caribbean Sea. Also on April 22, Mexico's National Meteorological Service (SMN) issued its forecast for the season, predicting it to be below-to-near-average, with 11–15 named storms, 4–7 hurricanes, and 1–2 major hurricanes.

On May 5, the Instituto de Meteorología de Cuba (INSMET) issued a forecast calling for eleven tropical cyclones, five hurricanes, and two major hurricanes with one tropical cyclone occurring in the Gulf of Mexico, two in the Caribbean, and eight in the Atlantic. On May 21, forecasters at NOAA's National Weather Service predicted a below-normal hurricane season with 8–14 named storms, 3–6 hurricanes, and 1–3 major hurricanes, factoring in expected development of an El Niño event, which would reduce the number of tropical systems, along with slightly above-normal Atlantic Ocean temperatures and weaker-than-average trade winds, which would favor development. On May 28, the Met Office released its prediction of nine named storms, five hurricanes, and two major hurricanes (with ranges of 6–12, 3–7, and 1–3, respectively) as well as an ACE index of 72 units.

=== Mid-season forecasts ===
On June 10, CSU reduced its predicted forecast to eleven named storms, five hurricanes and only two major hurricanes with a total ACE of 70, citing the high chance of a moderate-to-strong El Niño developing by September, as well as cooler SST anomalies observed during the month of May. On June 14, UA reduced its predicted hurricane activities in each category compared to its April prediction, with thirteen named storms, five hurricanes, three major hurricanes, and a total ACE of 106, primarily because the tropical Atlantic SST had not increased as much as expected from March to May. By early July, Colorado State University further reduced its prediction to nine named storms, four hurricanes, and one major hurricane, with anticipation for the ongoing moderate El Niño to intensify into a very strong El Niño by the climatological peak of hurricane season, resulting in very strong vertical wind shear across the Atlantic Basin. Additionally, the university forecast well below-average chances for a direct hurricane strike on the Continental United States and the Caribbean.

On August 6, NOAA further reduced their forecast amid a lull in activity approaching the typical peak of the season. Numbers were reduced slightly to seven-to-thirteen named storms, two-to-six hurricanes, and zero-to-two major hurricanes, and less than 5% chance of an above average season. These predictions aligned with expectations that El Niño conditions that had begun in June would continue to stifle tropical cyclogenesis.

== Seasonal summary ==
This season's ACE index, as of November 6, is approximately 19.9 units, as officially calculated by the NHC. This number represents the sum of the squares of the maximum sustained wind speeds (measured in knots) for all named storms while they are at least tropical storm intensity, divided by 10,000.

On June 17, Tropical Storm Arthur formed off the Texan coast, bringing flooding to the Gulf Coast of the United States and Mexico. An extended hiatus occurred after Arthur's dissipation, caused by the ongoing El Niño phase enhancing wind shear across the Atlantic along with Saharan dust. Wind shear in the Caribbean Sea during the month of July was the highest since records began in 1979. A month after Arthur dissipated, Tropical Storm Bertha formed in the northeastern Gulf of Mexico. Quiet conditions resumed until August 12, when Tropical Storm Cristobal formed well east-northeast of Bermuda. Later in the month, Tropical Storm Dolly formed in the main development region, while Edouard formed in the northern Gulf of Mexico. On September 19, Tropical Storm Fay formed in the subtropical Atlantic, nearly becoming the first hurricane of the season before quickly weakening due to wind shear two days later. Consequently, the season has become the first since 1914 to not have a hurricane so late into the season, and the third since official records began in 1851. Gonzalo later formed on September 25 near Cape Verde while Hanna ended September, forming on September 28. On October 6, Isaias formed in the Bay of Campeche. On October 8, Isaias reached hurricane strength, which tied it with the 1905 season with the latest first hurricane in the year, and the first hurricane to make landfall in the United States since Milton in 2024.

== Systems ==
=== Tropical Storm Arthur ===
- Tropical storm (SSHWS)
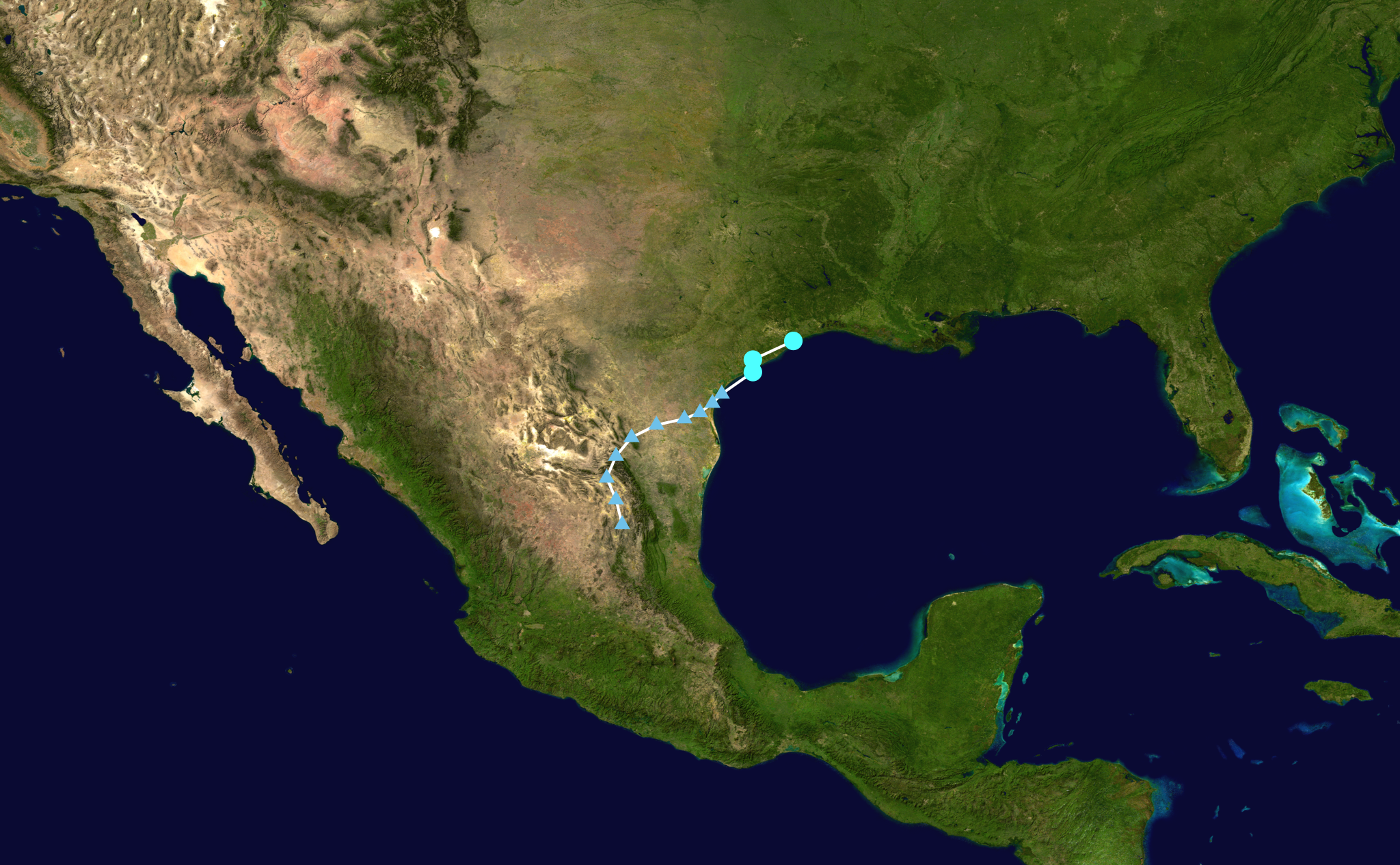
- Duration: June 17 – June 18
- Peak intensity: 60 mph (95 km/h) (1-min); 999 mbar (hPa)

On June 10, the National Hurricane Center began monitoring the Bay of Campeche for the development of a low-pressure area, partially associated with the remnants of Tropical Storm Cristina from the Eastern Pacific basin. On June 14, the low-pressure area moved inland over eastern Mexico. Conditions in the area were assessed as marginally favorable for development and, on June 16, the NHC started issuing advisories on Potential Tropical Cyclone One at 15:00 UTC. The following day at 15:00 UTC, the system acquired gale-force winds, as well as sustainable, albeit lopsided convection, and was named Tropical Storm Arthur by the NHC as it moved offshore from the Texas coast. A poorly-organized system, Arthur reached peak intensity with 1-minute sustained winds of 40 kt (45 mph) as it underwent a center relocation, making landfall near Galveston, Texas as a minimal tropical storm before degenerating into a remnant low.

As of October 2026, Arthur J. Gallagher & Co. estimated losses to be at US$1.3 billion. Four fatalities have been attributed to Arthur. Across Northern Mexico, significant rains fell, inundating roads. River flooding occurred in Piedras Negras. In the United States, flash floods occurred in Texas. Some parts of Louisiana received almost 30 inches (800 mm) of rain. The return period for the rains is estimated to be 1-in-1,000 years. Dozens of tornadoes formed across the Gulf Coast in relation to Arthur.

=== Tropical Storm Bertha ===
- Tropical storm (SSHWS)
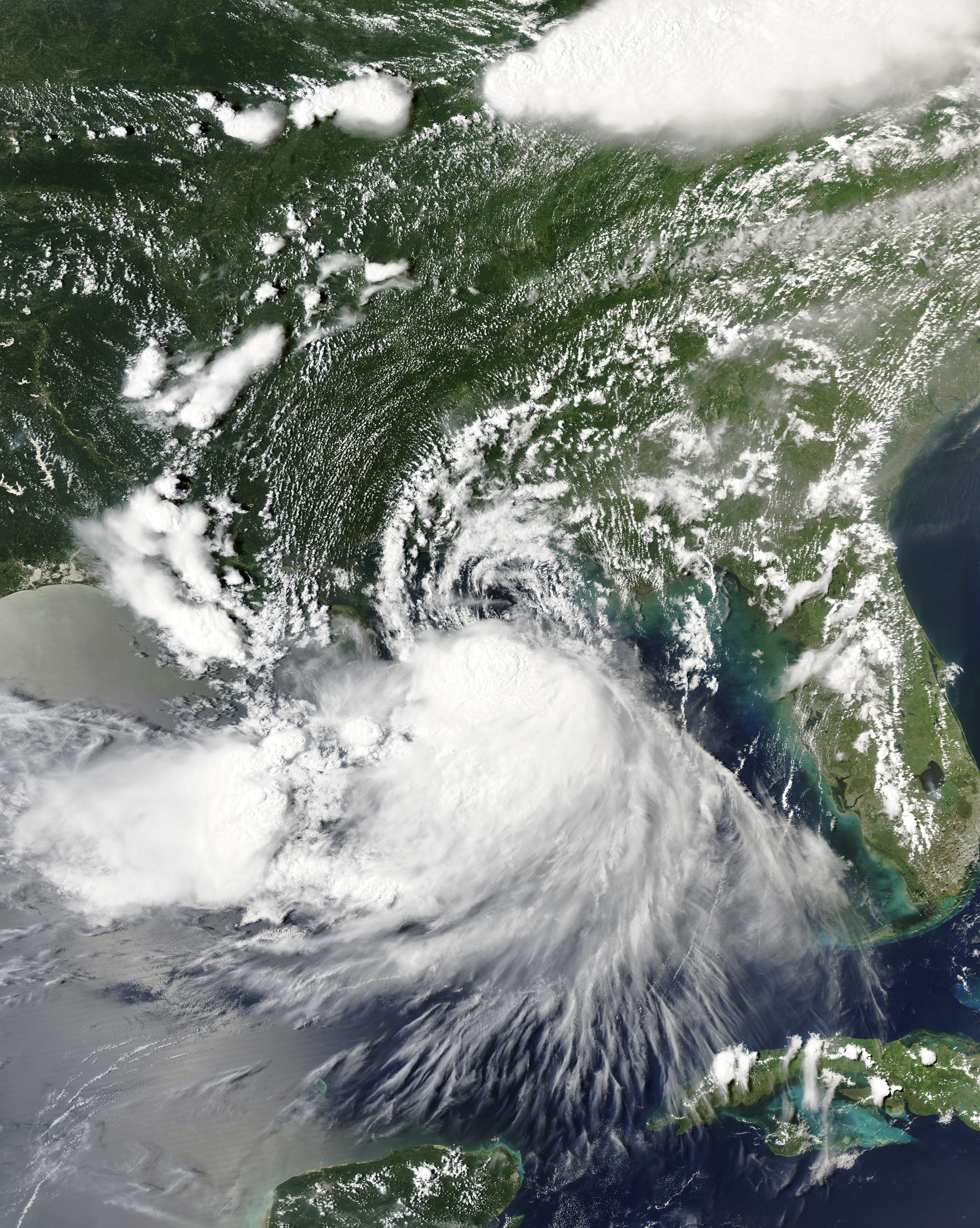
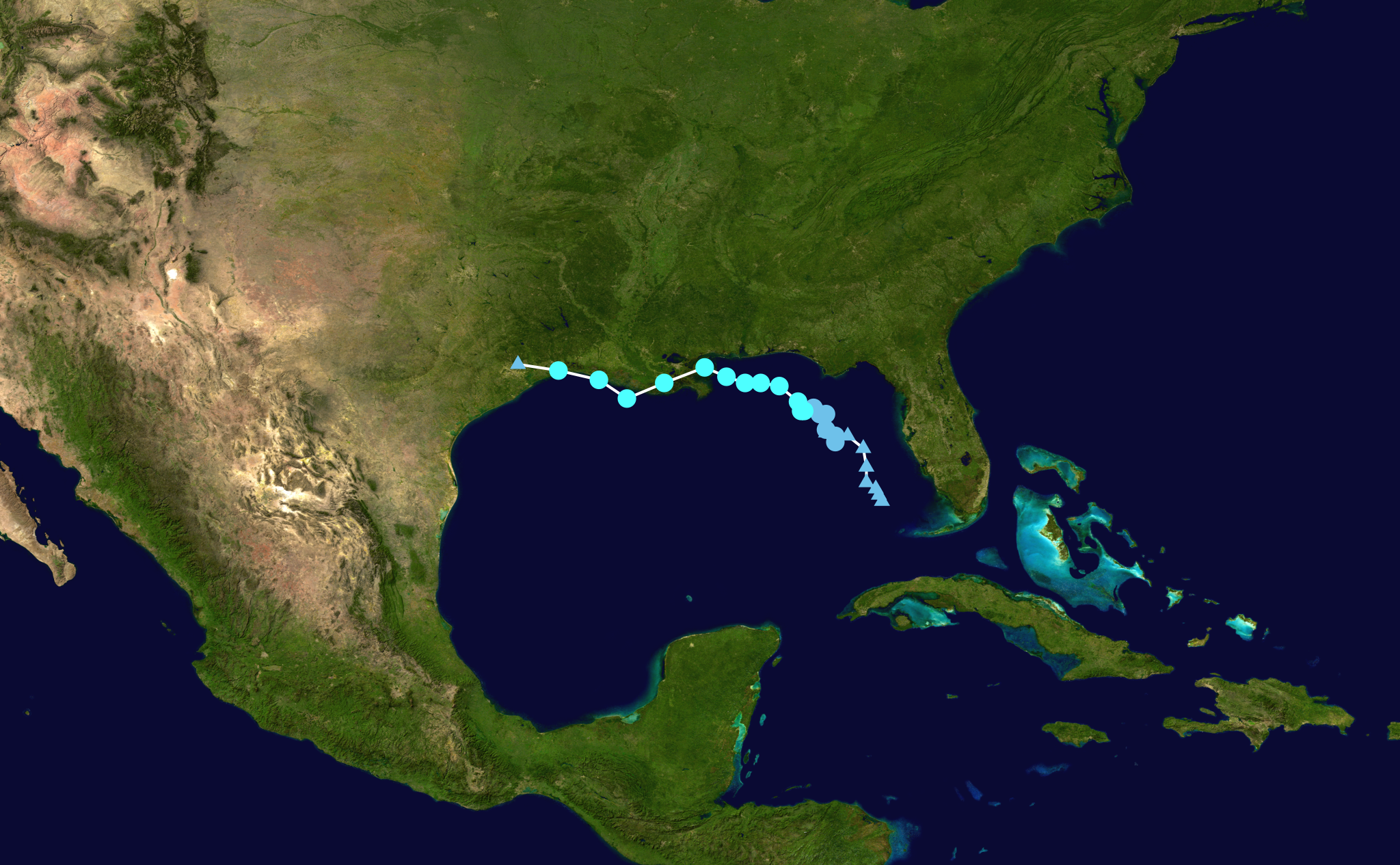
- Duration: July 19 – July 23
- Peak intensity: 60 mph (95 km/h) (1-min); 994 mbar (hPa)

An upper-level low and a surface trough formed over the eastern Gulf of Mexico on July 17. The following day, a broad low began to develop. The low then became Tropical Depression Two at 15:00 UTC on July 19 after developing a well-defined, low-level circulation. The system further organized over the next day, and the system was named Bertha with tropical-storm-force winds. Early on July 21, it attained winds of 60 miles per hour (97 km/h) and a pressure of 995 millibars (29.4 inHg). The storm then weakened, making landfall with winds of 45 miles per hour (72 km/h) close to the Biloxi Wildlife Management Area in St. Bernard Parish, Louisiana on July 22. On July 23, the center emerged offshore of southern Louisiana. It remained very close to the coastline and moved back inland near the Texas-Louisiana border the same day. It weakened to a tropical depression on July 24, soon degenerating to a trough over eastern Texas after losing a well-defined circulation.

Due to Bertha's shape, heavy rains from the storm were uncommon on the mainland. Instead, the system caused a significant amount of flooding through storm surge along with creating high surf across the Gulf Coast of the United States. In Florida, dozens of turtle nests were washed out or destroyed due to Bertha. Some roadways were inundated in Louisiana. As of October 2026, Arthur J. Gallagher & Co. estimated losses to be at US$400 million.

=== Tropical Storm Cristobal ===
- Tropical storm (SSHWS)
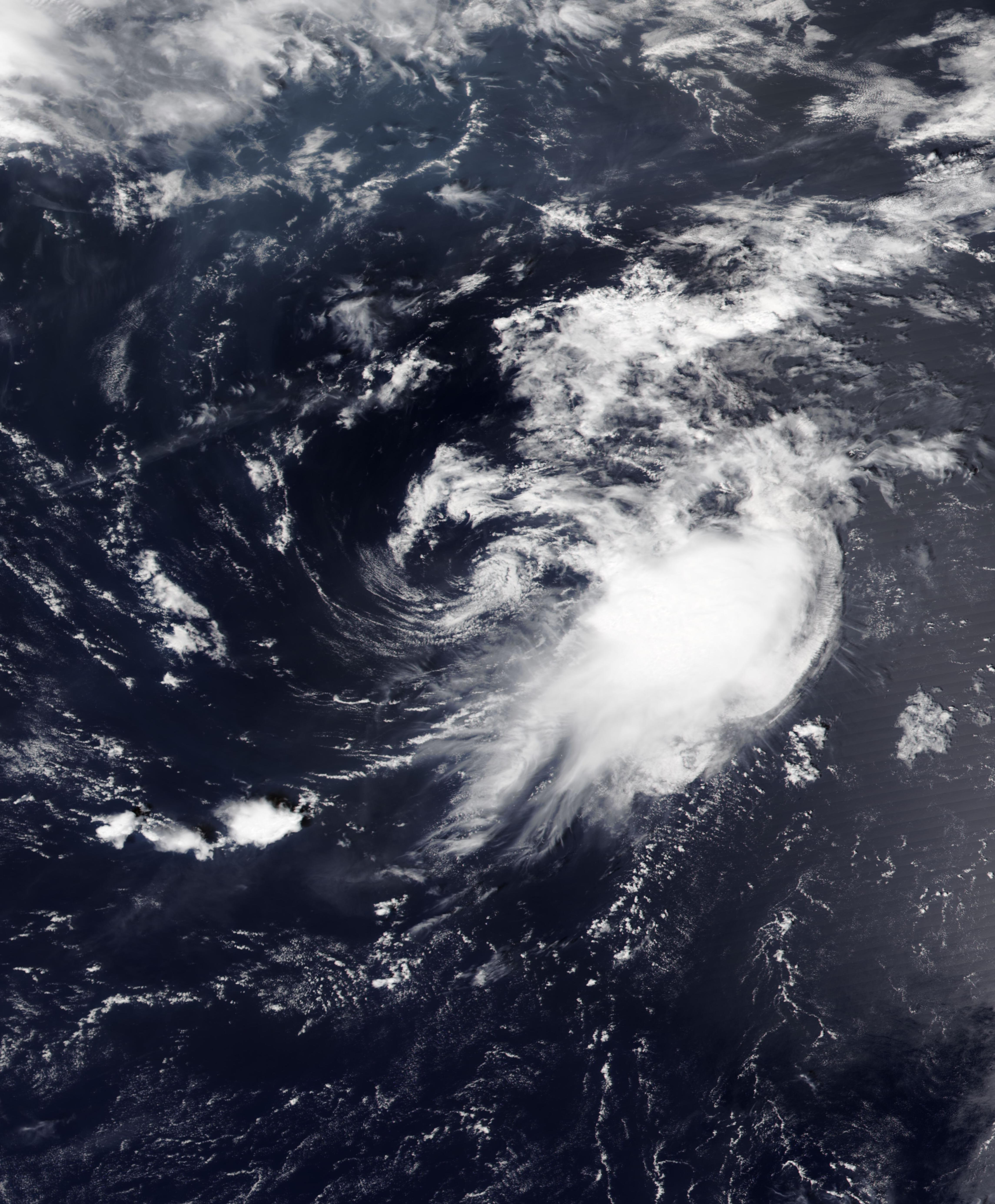
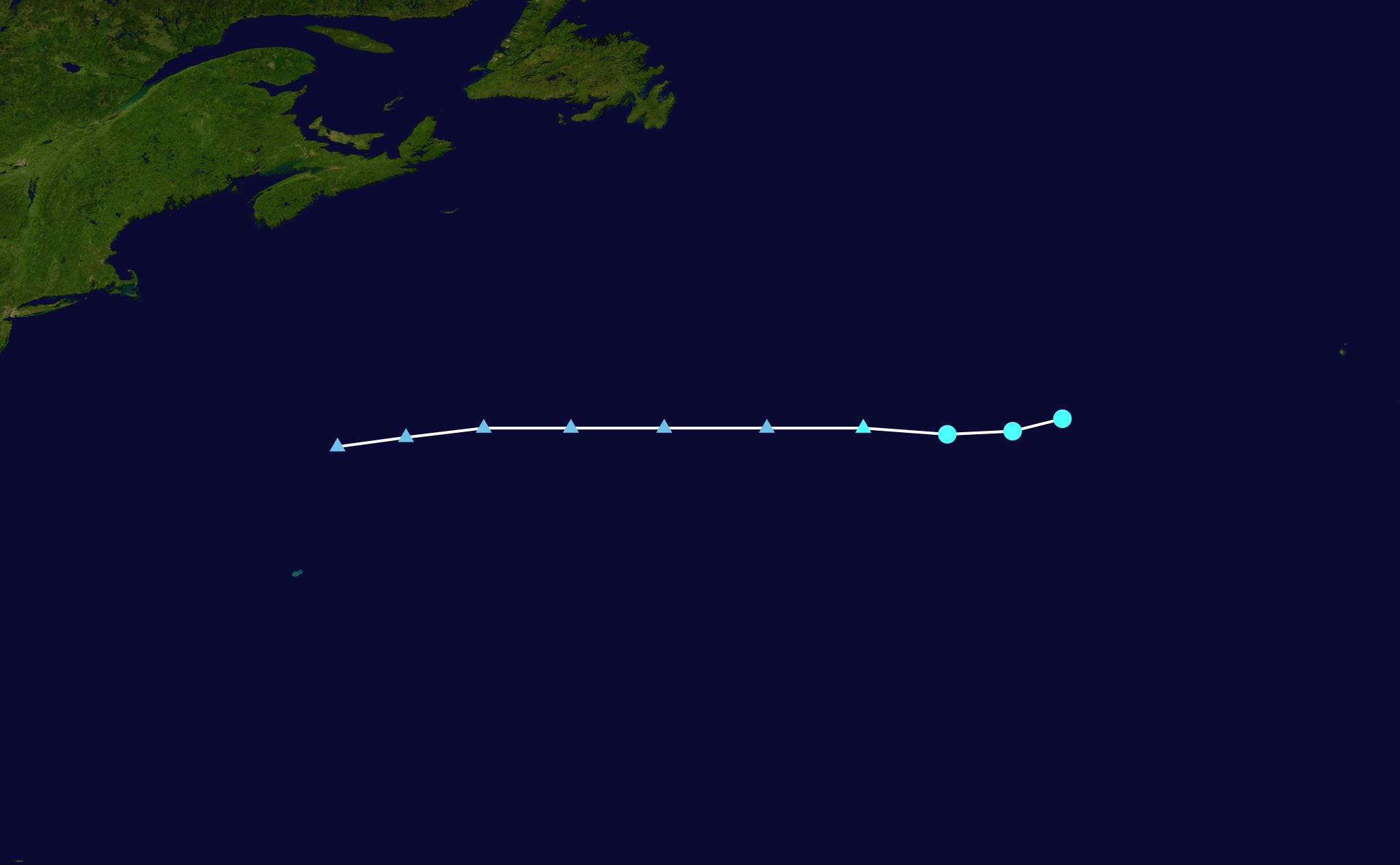
- Duration: August 12 – August 13
- Peak intensity: 45 mph (75 km/h) (1-min); 1003 mbar (hPa)

On August 2, a trough became identifiable over the Atlantic Ocean southwest of the Azores. The trough moved to the southwest, passing over the Bahamas on August 7. A ridge then began steering the trough northward off the East Coast of the United States before passing north of Bermuda. Over the next few days, the system gradually organized, eventually becoming sufficiently organized to be classified as a tropical storm, receiving the name Cristobal on August 12. Cristobal's environment was quite unfavorable, with high wind shear, low SSTs, and dry air, causing the system to weaken to a tropical depression by August 13. Having lost convection, Cristobal became a post-tropical cyclone later that day.

=== Tropical Storm Dolly ===
- Tropical storm (SSHWS)
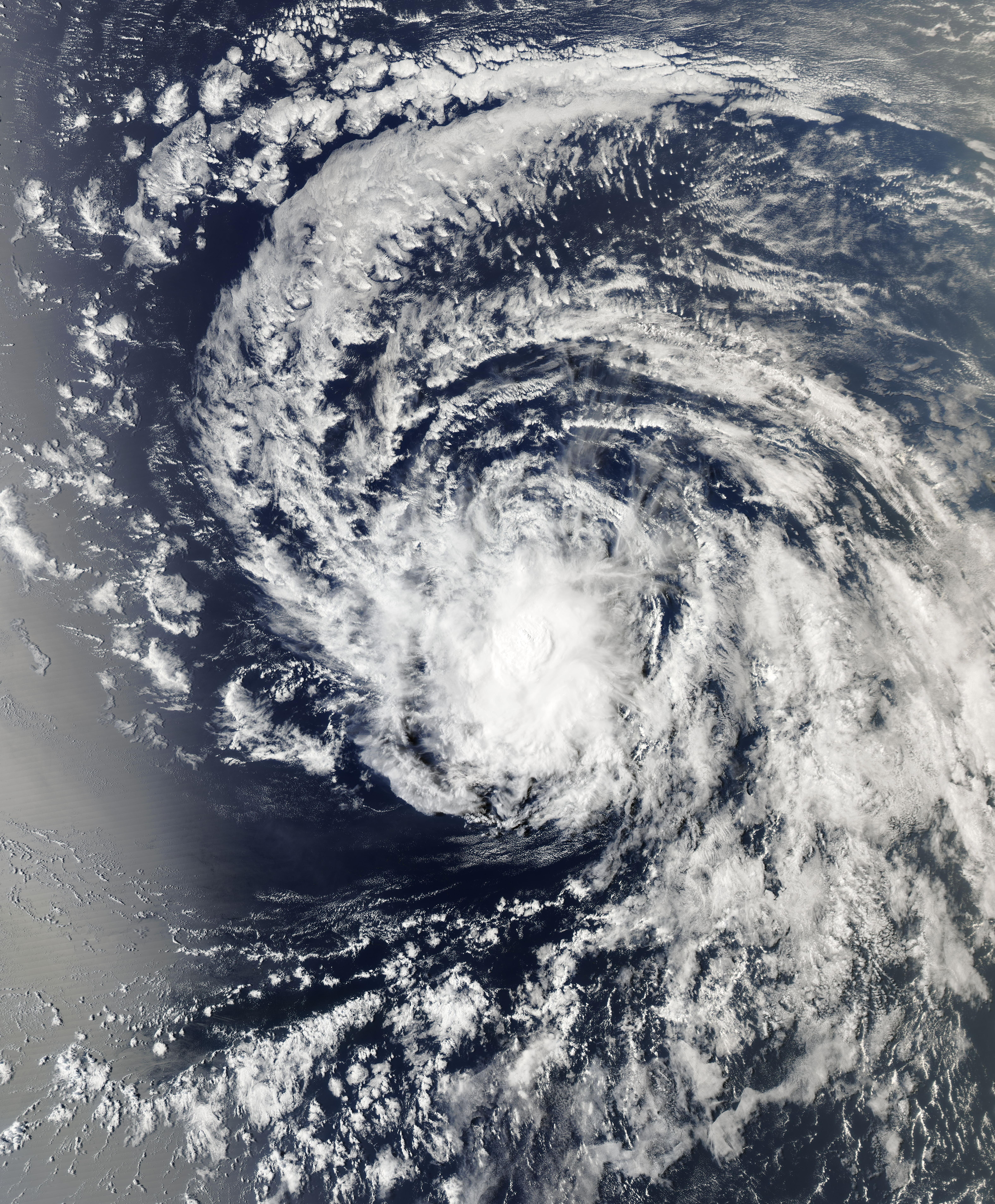
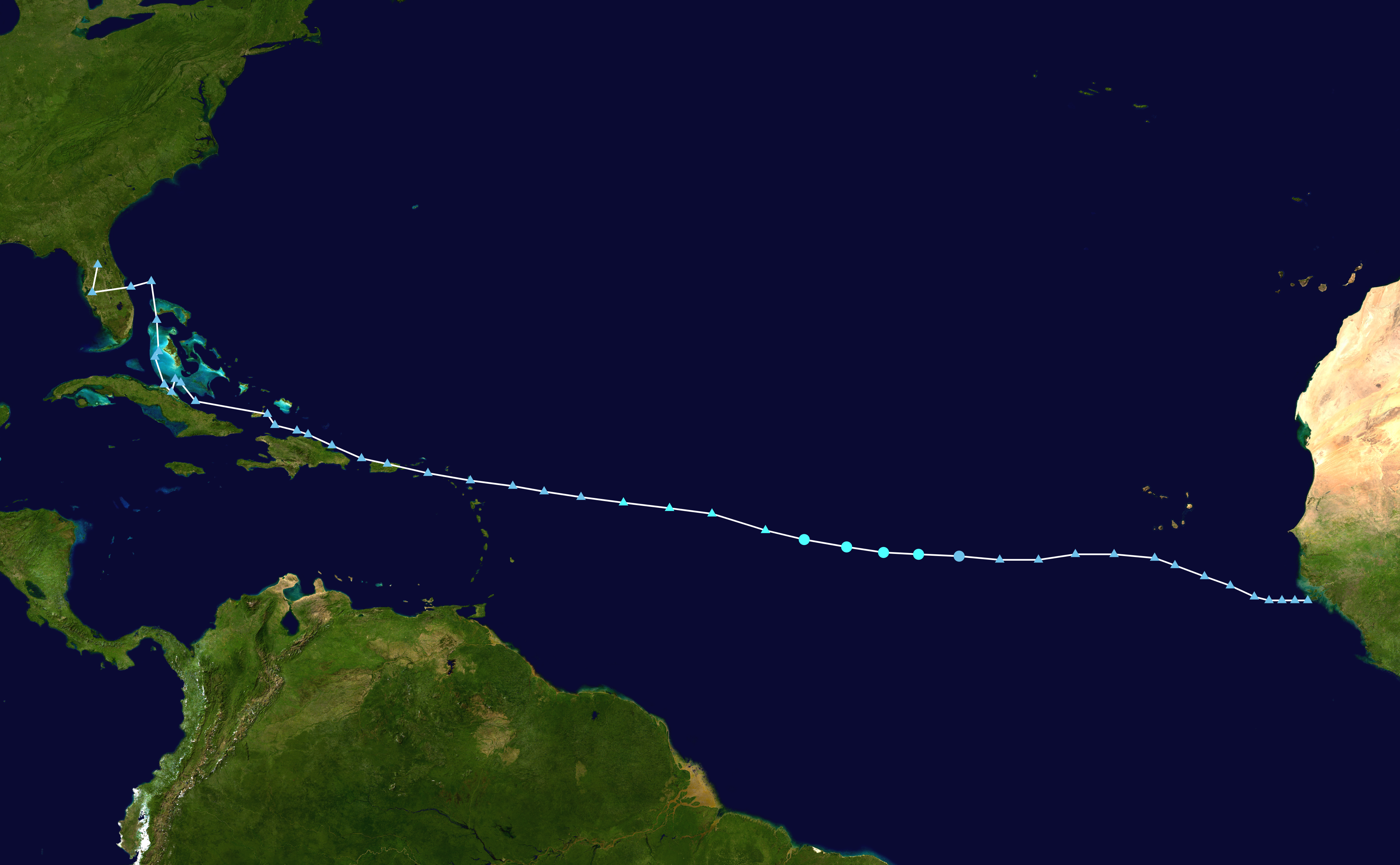
- Duration: August 27 – August 28
- Peak intensity: 40 mph (65 km/h) (1-min); 1007 mbar (hPa)

On August 24, a tropical wave exited the coast of Africa. The disturbance gradually developed within a break in unfavorable conditions within the Main Development Region (MDR) until it attained sufficient organization to be designated Tropical Storm Dolly on August 27 in the central Atlantic. Dolly failed to strengthen following its formation, entraining dry air into its circulation and slowly losing organization. A NOAA buoy which Dolly passed near failed to find any westerly winds near the storm's center. Thus, at 15:00 UTC on August 28, Dolly was designated as an open tropical wave. The NHC continued to monitor its remnants for potential redevelopment through August 31, as they crossed the Leeward Islands and Greater Antilles.

As a tropical wave, the remnants of Dolly produced heavy rainfall and thunderstorms in the Antilles. Fonds-Saint-Denis, Martinique recorded 4.41 in (111.9 mm) of rain fell in six hours, including 3.76 in (95.4 mm) in three hours. The remnants of Dolly also dropped rain over Puerto Rico, partially alleviating a drought. Several reservoirs on the island exceeded typical levels of water held. Some seas off the Dominican Republic had wave heights up to 7 feet (2.1 m). Some rain from Dolly's remnants also reached Florida and Georgia.

=== Tropical Storm Edouard ===
- Tropical storm (SSHWS)
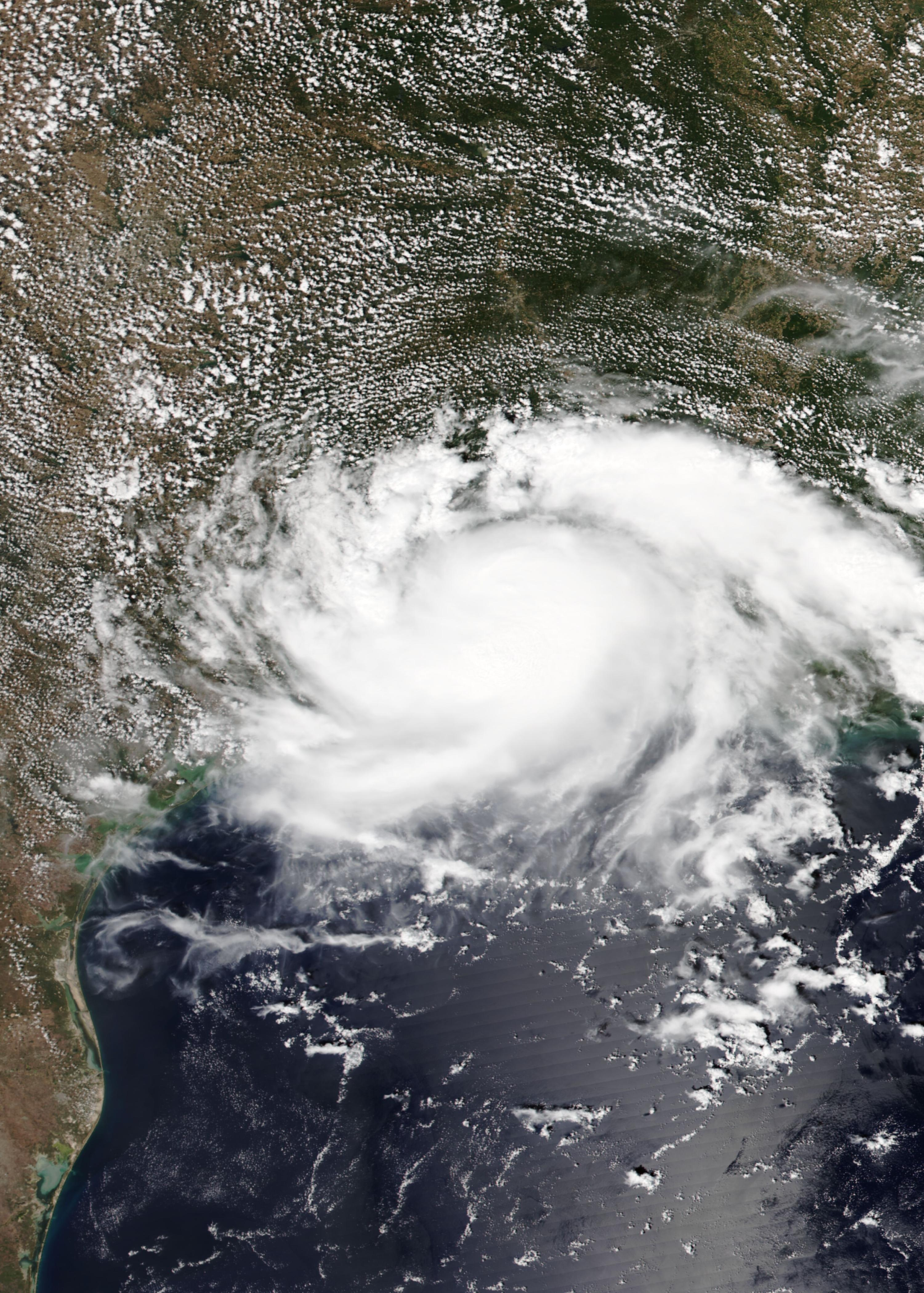
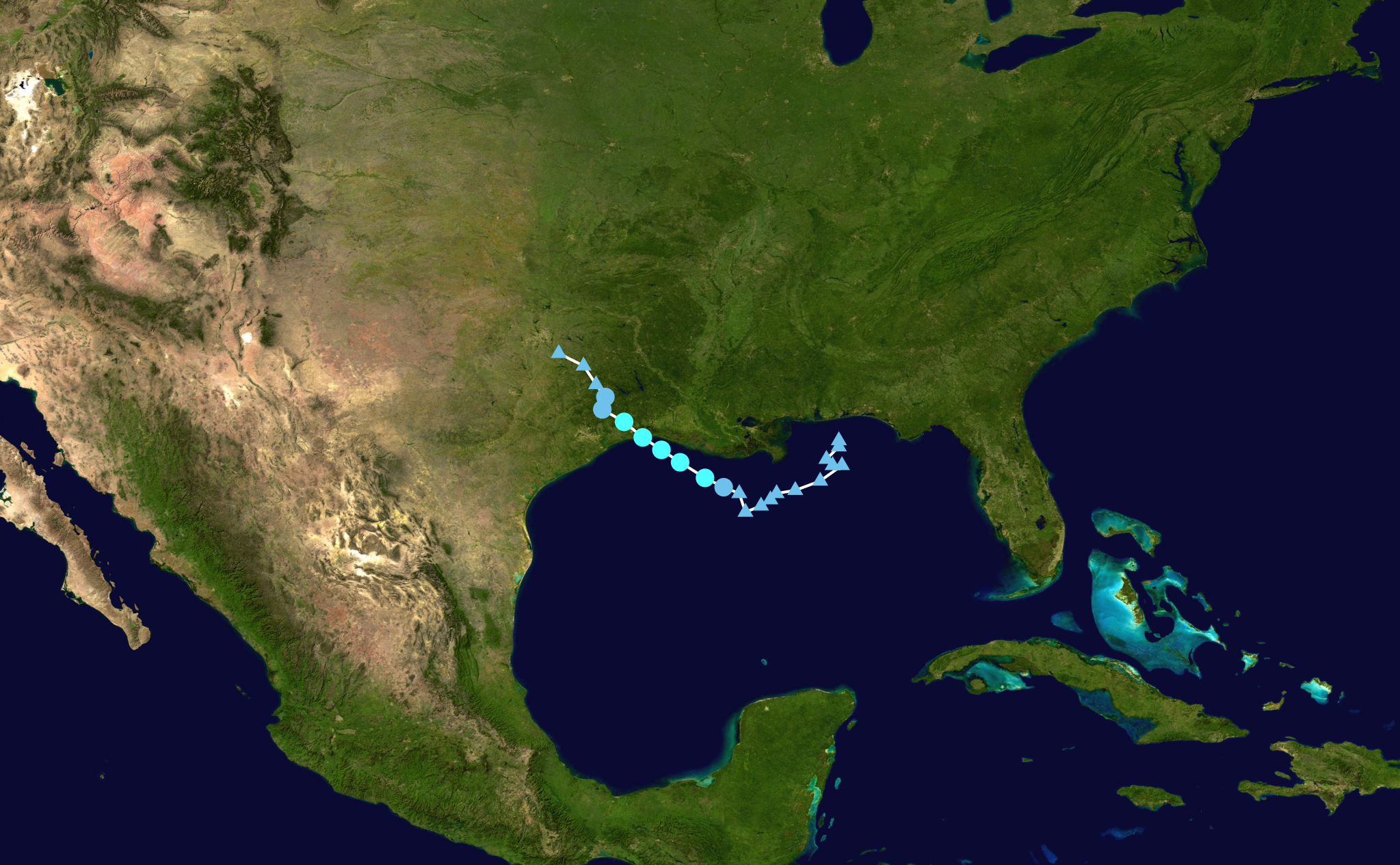
- Duration: August 31 – September 3
- Peak intensity: 60 mph (95 km/h) (1-min); 996 mbar (hPa)

On August 31, the NHC started advisories on Potential Tropical Cyclone Five. Later that day, the system organized into a tropical depression. At 00:00 UTC on September 1, the depression strengthened to Tropical Storm Edouard. Over the next few hours before landfall, Edouard gradually intensified near the coast of Louisiana. At 19:20 UTC that day, Edouard made landfall near Johnson Bayou, Louisiana, with peak winds of 60 mph (95 km/h) and a pressure of 996 mbar. The system then weakened to a tropical depression over southeastern Texas on September 2. The storm continued over Texas throughout the day, remaining a tropical depression, before eventually degenerating into a remnant low on September 3.

While Edouard moved ashore, it produced wind gusts of 71 mph (114 km/h) in Texas Point. The storm also dropped heavy rainfall, reaching 17.71 in (450 mm) at a station along the Little Pine Island Bayou. Rainfall left several roads in Texas inundated. Flooding also forced the rescue and evacuation of a couple dozen people. As of October 2026, Arthur J. Gallagher & Co. estimated losses to be at US$140 million.

=== Tropical Storm Fay ===
- Tropical storm (SSHWS)
- Duration: September 19 – September 29
- Peak intensity: 70 mph (110 km/h) (1-min); 995 mbar (hPa)

On September 18, the NHC began tracking a trough for development in the eastern Atlantic. On the following day, the system organized and developed into Tropical Depression Six about 525 mi (845 km) southwest of the Azores. The area the system formed in was flanked by two regions of high wind shear. At 09:00 UTC on September 20, the depression strengthened to Tropical Storm Fay, with deep convection increasing significantly while moving northeastward. On September 21, a building ridge north of Fay began turning the system towards the southwest. Around this time, Fay also began experiencing significant wind shear and dry air intrusions, limiting possible intensification and making the system lopsided. By September 22, the center of circulation became exposed. Convection collapsed later that day, leading Fay to become a remnant low. On September 23, convection restarted over Fay's circulation, marking its return to tropical cyclone status. Early the following day on September 24, Fay restrengthened to a tropical storm. Wind shear and dry air began to impact the system on September 25. Fay then weakened to a tropical depression on September 26. On September 29, Fay briefly restrengthened into a tropical storm once more before weakening back into a depression, and once again transitioning into a post-tropical cyclone later that day.

=== Tropical Storm Gonzalo ===
- Tropical storm (SSHWS)
- Duration: September 25 – September 26
- Peak intensity: 50 mph (85 km/h) (1-min); 1000 mbar (hPa)

Early on September 25, an enclosed center of circulation formed near Cape Verde, indicating that the low-pressure area had evolved into a tropical storm. The environment upon Gonzalo's formation was somewhat favorable, with moderate humidity and SSTs. The system was sheared and asymmetrical, with most convection displaced to the eastern and southern sides of the storm. Gonzalo was progressing north. Early the next day, ASCAT indicated that Gonzalo's center became elongated and the system as a whole was weakening. At the end of the day, the center had reorganized slightly based on GOES-19's data, though ASCAT still showed weakening winds. However, the convection continued to pull away from the center of circulation, leading to Gonzalo being declared a post-tropical cyclone.

Across Cape Verde, stormy conditions occurred. Trees were reported to have fallen across several islands including Sal and Santiago. Power outages were also reported on those islands, particularly on northern Santiago. Urban flooding happened in Santa Maria and Praia. Tourist infrastructure was damaged in Santa Maria while agricultural lands were damaged on São Nicolau. Several fishing vessels were damaged along Cais Beach in Mosteiros while another vessel was swept away by the sea and is currently missing. The Gambia also reported rains from the precursor tropical wave that made houses inaccessible.

=== Tropical Storm Hanna ===
- Tropical storm (SSHWS)
- Duration: September 28 – September 30
- Peak intensity: 45 mph (75 km/h) (1-min); 1002 mbar (hPa)

On September 26, the NHC began tracking a trough of low pressure well southeast of Bermuda. The system gradually became more organized as it moved northeastward over the following day. At 15:00 UTC on September 28, the NHC named the system Hanna as it moved eastward. Subjected to strong wind shear, Hanna remained a lopsided system as it turned east-southeast. Gradual weakening followed the next day due to the unfavorable environment, and Hanna became post-tropical on September 30 as convection dissipated from its center.

=== Hurricane Isaias ===
- Category 3 hurricane (SSHWS)
- Duration: October 6 – October 10
- Peak intensity: 120 mph (195 km/h) (1-min); 958 mbar (hPa)

On October 3, the NHC first identified a potential area for tropical cyclone formation, related to a low-pressure area that was expected to develop over the southwestern Gulf of Mexico. Two days later, a trough developed along the gulf coast of Mexico, producing an area of thunderstorms. The system drifted to the east and became more organized. At 21:00 UTC on October 6, it developed into Tropical Depression Nine about 380 mi (615 km) west of Progreso, Yucatán. The depression was small with a closed, but elongated circulation. At 09:00 UTC on October 7, the depression was upgraded to a tropical storm and was assigned the name Isaias by the NHC. At 03:30 UTC the next morning, Isaias was upgraded to a hurricane. At 12:20 UTC on October 9, Isaias was upgraded to a major Category 3 hurricane. Isaias made landfall near Destin, Florida, at 01:30 UTC on October 10, with maximum sustained winds of 165 km/h (105 mph) and a minimum central pressure of 971 mbar (28.67 inHg). Shortly after moving inland, Isaias began to rapidly weaken while losing its tropical characteristics while moving northward. During the morning on October 10 at 09:00 UTC, Satellite imagery showed that all deep convection has been moved well northward from the low-level center, with a warm front extending eastward from the system, thus being declared a post-tropical cyclone while gradually moving northward.

In combination with a cold front, the predecessor to Isaias caused significant damage to Tamaulipas and Veracruz including floods, downed trees, and power outages. There were at least nine fatalities in the United States: six in Florida, two in Alabama, and one in South Carolina.

=== Subtropical Storm Josephine ===
- Subtropical storm (SSHWS)
- Duration: October 21 – October 22
- Peak intensity: 65 mph (100 km/h) (1-min); 988 mbar (hPa)

On October 17, the NHC first noted the potential for a subtropical cyclone to develop within seven days, related to a low-pressure area that was expected to form off the East Coast of the United States. A day later, the low, initially considered to be a nor'easter, began developing along a frontal boundary. By October 20, the circulation was producing thunderstorms west of the center, although it was still attached to the front. Over the next day, the thunderstorms organized as the low separated from the front. Late on October 21, the NHC classified the system as Subtropical Storm Josephine about 265 mi (425 km) south of Nantucket, Massachusetts. By that time, the storm was moving slowly northward along the northern edge of the Gulf Stream, with maximum sustained winds of 65 mph (100 km/h). Late on October 22, Josephine transitioned into an extratropical cyclone, as it interacted with a developing front. The storm accelerated northeastward ahead of a trough moving through eastern North America.

The storm resulted in a 51 mph (82 km/h) wind gust at Diamond Shoals and a 2.5 ft (0.76 m) storm surge at Kings Bay, Georgia. The storm also flooded over North Carolina Route 12 and cut off power to some homes in the Outer Banks. Wind gusts in Montauk, Long Island, reached 36 mph (58 km/h). The extratropical remnants of Josephine produced 75 mph (121 km/h) wind gusts on Sable Island. The storm halted ferry travel between Nova Scotia and eastern Prince Edward Island. Météo-France issued warnings for similar conditions for the islands of Saint Pierre and Miquelon; consequently, the ferry service to Newfoundland for October 23 has been cancelled, and the French Navy vessel Monge has called off its scheduled stop at the port of Saint-Pierre due to the weather conditions.

== Storm names ==
The following list of names will be used for storms that form in the Atlantic basin during 2026. This was the same list used in the 2020 season with the exception of Leah, which replaced Laura.

- Arthur
- Bertha
- Cristobal
- Dolly
- Edouard
- Fay
- Gonzalo
- Hanna
- Isaias
- Josephine
- Kyle (unused)
- Leah (unused)
- Marco (unused)
- Nana (unused)
- Omar (unused)
- Paulette (unused)
- Rene (unused)
- Sally (unused)
- Teddy (unused)
- Vicky (unused)
- Wilfred (unused)

The name Dolly was noted for coincidentally being used close to the death of Dolly Parton, which happened two days prior to the system's formation.

== Season effects ==
The following is a table which will include all of the storms that form in the 2026 Atlantic hurricane season. It will include their duration, names, intensities, areas affected, damages, and death totals. Deaths in parentheses are additional and indirect (an example of an indirect death would be a traffic accident), but were still related to that storm. Damage and deaths include totals while the storm was extratropical, a wave, or a low, and all of the damage figures will be in 2026 USD.

Saffir–Simpson scale
TD	TS	C1	C2	C3	C4	C5

2026 North Atlantic tropical cyclone season statistics
Storm name	Dates active	Storm category at peak intensity	Max 1-min wind mph (km/h)	Min. press. (mbar)	Areas affected	Damage (US$)	Deaths	Ref(s).
Arthur	June 17–18	Tropical storm	60 (95)	999	Veracruz, Northern Mexico, Gulf Coast of the United States	$700 million	1 (2)	
Bertha	July 19–23	Tropical storm	60 (95)	994	Gulf Coast of the United States	$400 million	None	
Cristobal	August 12–13	Tropical storm	45 (75)	1003	None	None	None	
Dolly	August 27–28	Tropical storm	40 (65)	1007	Antilles	None	None	
Edouard	August 31 – September 3	Tropical storm	60 (95)	996	Coastal Louisiana and East Texas	$140 million	None	
Fay	September 19–29	Tropical storm	70 (110)	995	None	None	None	
Gonzalo	September 25–26	Tropical storm	50 (85)	1000	Cape Verde, The Gambia	Unknown	None	
Hanna	September 28–30	Tropical storm	45 (75)	1002	None	None	None	
Isaias	October 6–10	Category 3 hurricane	120 (195)	958	Eastern Mexico, Alabama, Mississippi, Florida Panhandle	>$2 billion	9	
Josephine	October 21–22	Subtropical storm	65 (100)	988	East Coast of the United States, Atlantic Canada	Unknown	None	
Season aggregates
10 systems	June 17 – Season ongoing		120 (195)	959		>$3.24 billion	12	

== See also ==
- Weather of 2026
- Tropical cyclones in 2026
- 2026 Pacific hurricane season
- 2026 Pacific typhoon season
- 2026 North Indian Ocean cyclone season
- South-West Indian Ocean cyclone seasons: 2025–26, 2026–27
- Australian region cyclone seasons: 2025–26, 2026–27
- South Pacific cyclone seasons: 2025–26, 2026–27
