= Tropical Storm Bertha (2026) =

Atlantic tropical storm in 2026

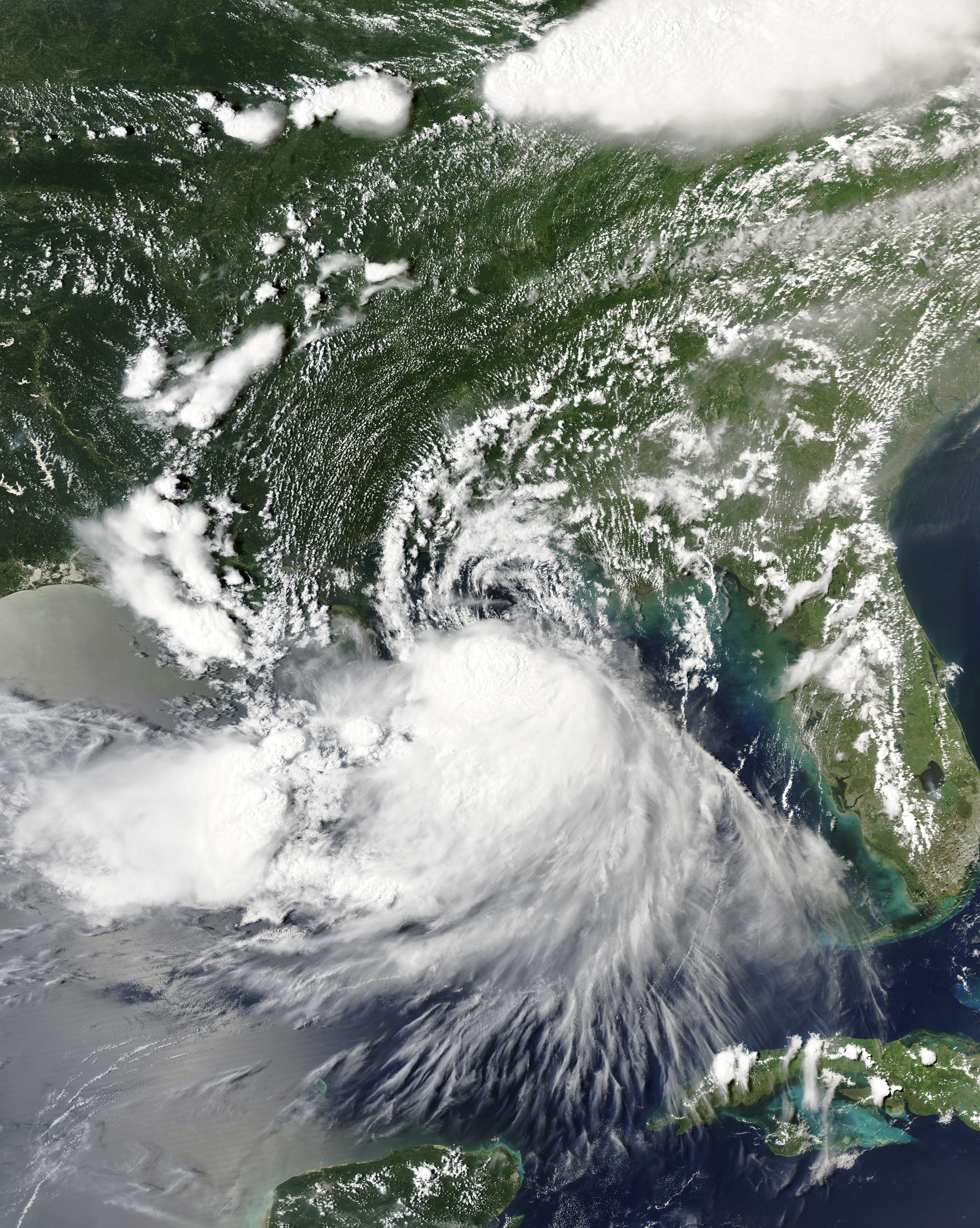
- Bertha at peak intensity in the Gulf of Mexico on July 21

Meteorological history
- Formed: July 19, 2026
- Remnant low: July 23, 2026
- Dissipated: July 24, 2026

Tropical storm
- 1-minute sustained (SSHWS/NWS)
- Highest winds: 60 mph (95 km/h)
- Lowest pressure: 994 mbar (hPa); 29.35 inHg

Overall effects
- Fatalities: None
- Damage: >$400 million (2026 USD)
- Areas affected: Gulf Coast of the United States
- IBTrACS
- Part of the 2026 Atlantic hurricane season

Tropical Storm Bertha was a moderately strong and erratic tropical storm that affected the Gulf Coast of the United States. The second named storm of the 2026 Atlantic hurricane season, Bertha formed on July 19 in the northeastern Gulf of Mexico. Over the next few days, Bertha progressed westward along the northern rim of the basin. Despite being so close to land, Bertha left minimal impacts due to having a lopsided shape with the majority of its rains over water. Bertha made two landfalls in Louisiana before opening into a trough over Texas.

As of October 2026, Arthur J. Gallagher & Co. estimated losses to be at $400 million (2026 USD).

== Meteorological history ==
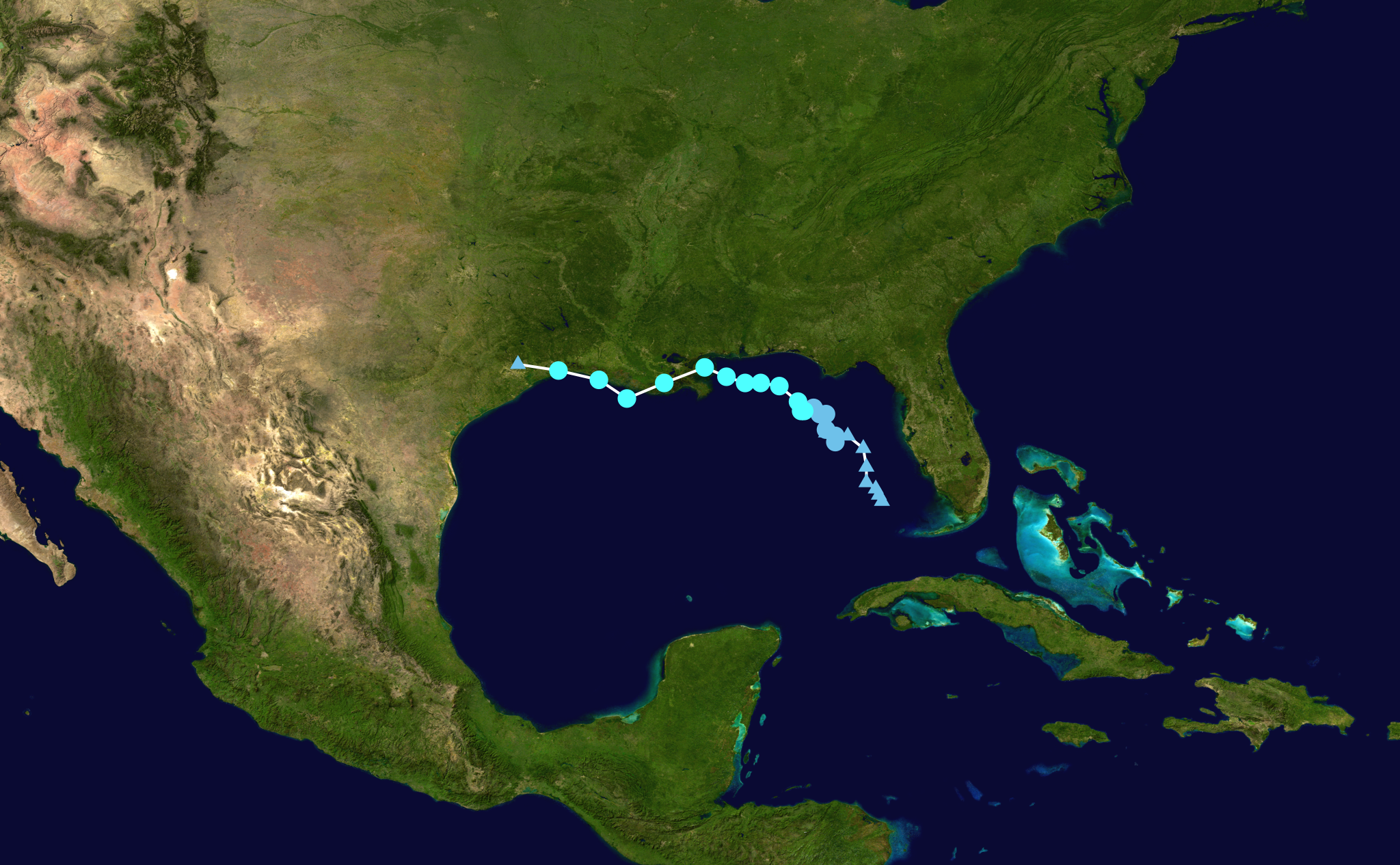
Map plotting the storm's track and intensity, according to the Saffir–Simpson scale Map key Saffir–Simpson scale Tropical depression (≤38 mph, ≤62 km/h) Tropical storm (39–73 mph, 63–118 km/h) Category 1 (74–95 mph, 119–153 km/h) Category 2 (96–110 mph, 154–177 km/h) Category 3 (111–129 mph, 178–208 km/h) Category 4 (130–156 mph, 209–251 km/h) Category 5 (≥157 mph, ≥252 km/h) Unknown Storm type Tropical cyclone Subtropical cyclone Extratropical cyclone, remnant low, tropical disturbance, or monsoon depression

A tropical upper tropospheric trough (TUTT) formed in the Caribbean region in mid-July. The TUTT would progress towards Florida over the next few days. While over Florida, the TUTT would produce a surface-level trough and associated convection over the Gulf of Mexico on July 16–17. That convection would evolve into a mesoscale convective vortex on July 18. Convection was limited though due to the low lying in dry air. On July 19, scatterometer data indicated a closed circulation formed and convection was considered organized enough for the transition to a weak tropical depression had been undertaken. Upon formation, steering currents in the region of the system were weak as a result of two high-pressure zones over the Atlantic and Southeastern United States, making the system's movement slow and erratic. Sea surface temperatures in the area were also warm, around 85–87 °F (29–31 °C). For the rest of the day, convection would be sheared and primarily focused to the south of the center of circulation. On July 20, tropical-storm-force winds were found by hurricane hunters and the storm received the name Bertha as it began moving westward south of Panama City, Florida. Some rain bands did impact land, though inconsistently, even though the bulk of rains lied offshore. Early on July 21, Bertha attained a peak intensity with winds of 60 miles per hour (97 km/h) and a pressure of 995 millibars (29.4 inHg). On July 22, Bertha began weakening while progressing westward as its center of circulation became exposed. That day, the system made landfall in St. Bernard Parish, Louisiana, with sustained winds of 45 miles per hour (72 km/h). The next day, Bertha's center of circulation briefly pulled off of Louisiana's coast before making landfall a second time on Pecan Island. Inland over Texas, Bertha had a poor state of organization and weakened further. On July 24, Bertha dissipated opening into a trough.

== Preparations ==
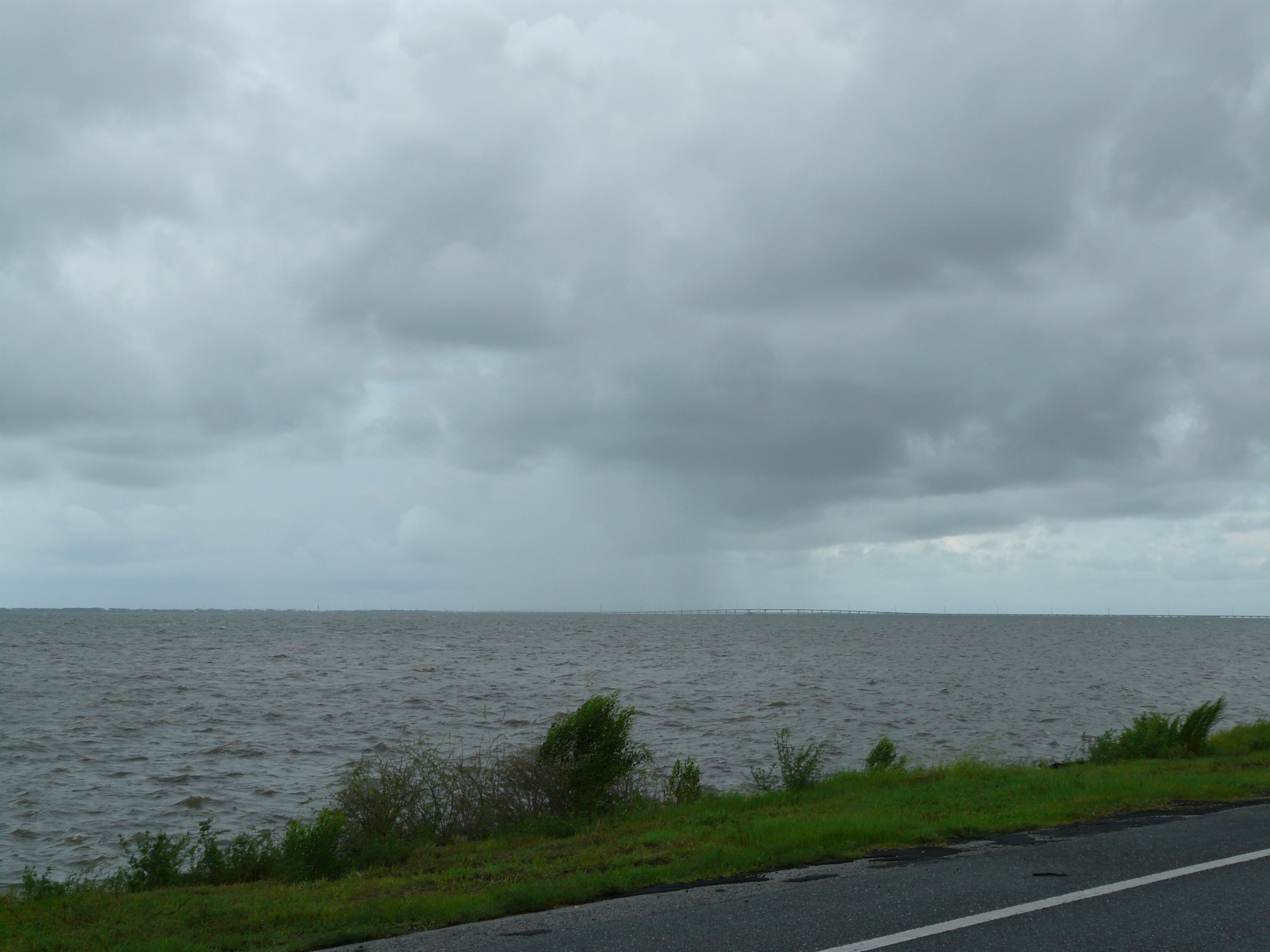
Outer bands over St. George Sound in Florida

Upon designation as a tropical depression, tropical storm watches and warnings were issued for much of the Gulf Coast of the United States, from the Florida panhandle to the Texas Gulf Coast. A storm surge watch was also issued for parts of the coast. For the first time since at least 2005 in Southern Louisiana, portions of the region were under both a tropical storm warning and extreme heat warning. Double red flags were flown across beaches along the gulf. Parts of Gulf Islands National Seashore closed ahead of Bertha's impacts.

Escambia County, Florida, increased the number of staff working on-standby and cleared storm drains in preparation for Bertha. Santa Rosa County cancelled the Bands on The Beach event for the night of July 21 due to expected inclement weather conditions. Escambia and Santa Rosa Counties both offered free sand to citizens. Citizens Property Insurance Corporation prevented consumers form forming new policies as Bertha developed.

Sandbags were also distributed across Louisiana and southern Mississippi. Several floodgates in St. Bernard Parish were closed ahead of the storm. Terrebonne Parish made emergency repairs to levees that were damaged after Hurricane Francine after receiving approval from the Federal Emergency Management Agency and Government of Louisiana. Lafourche Parish pumped water out of some reservoirs to make room for rain. The Sewage and Water Board of New Orleans placed employees at stations that are usually unmanned. Several colleges in New Orleans closed before Bertha. The commencement of the Grand Isle Tarpon Rodeo was delayed as Bertha approached. Chevron Corporation temporarily shut down some operations in the Gulf of Mexico including Petronius. BP also pulled employees from Thunder Horse PDQ and Na Kika. The Galveston Historic Seaport cancelled boat-based sightseeing expeditions for July 23.

Amtrak suspended the Mardi Gras Service on the afternoon of July 21 and the entirety of July 22 due to the storm.

== Impact ==
=== Gulf Coast of the United States ===
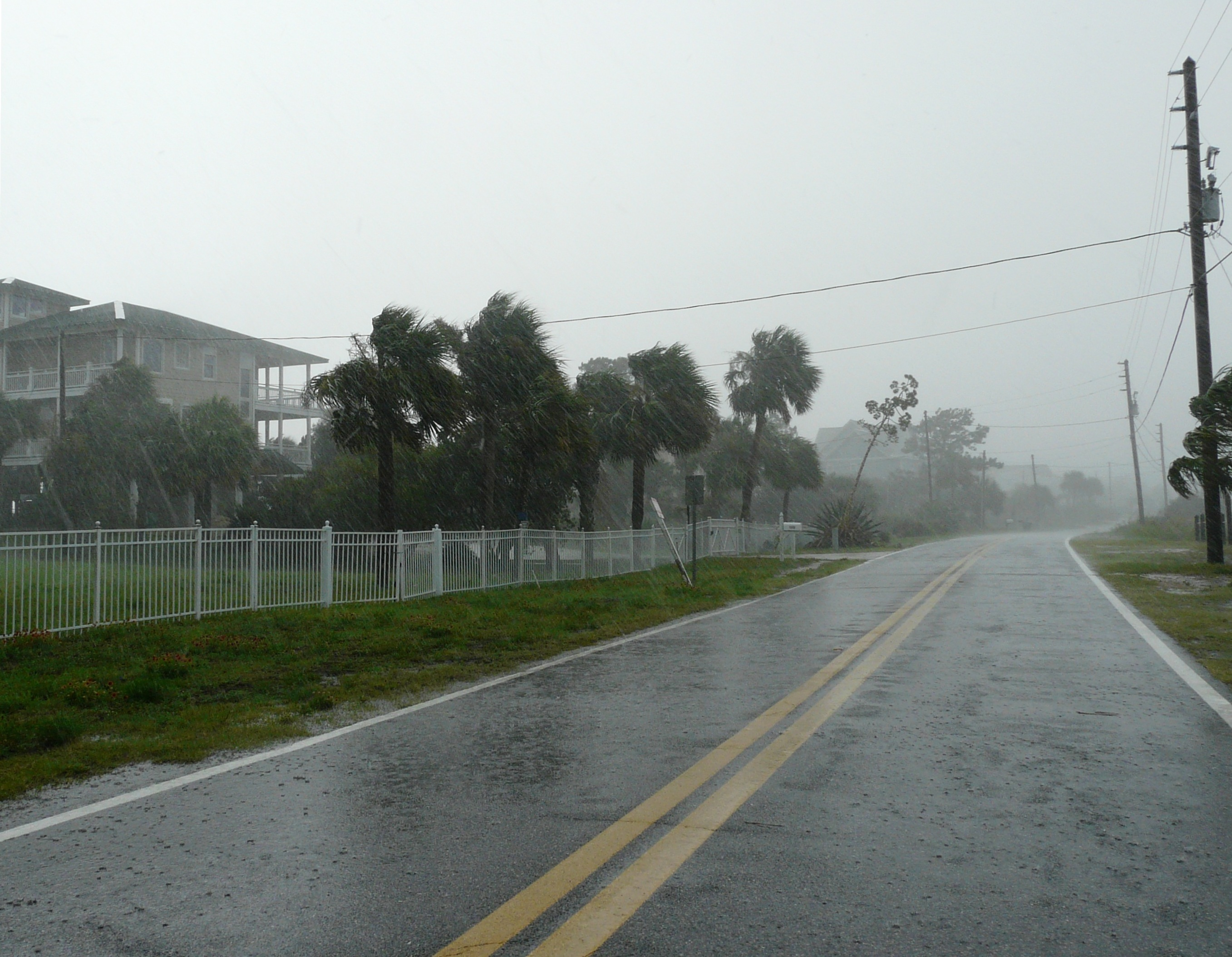
Squalls associated with Bertha sweep over Alligator Point, Florida

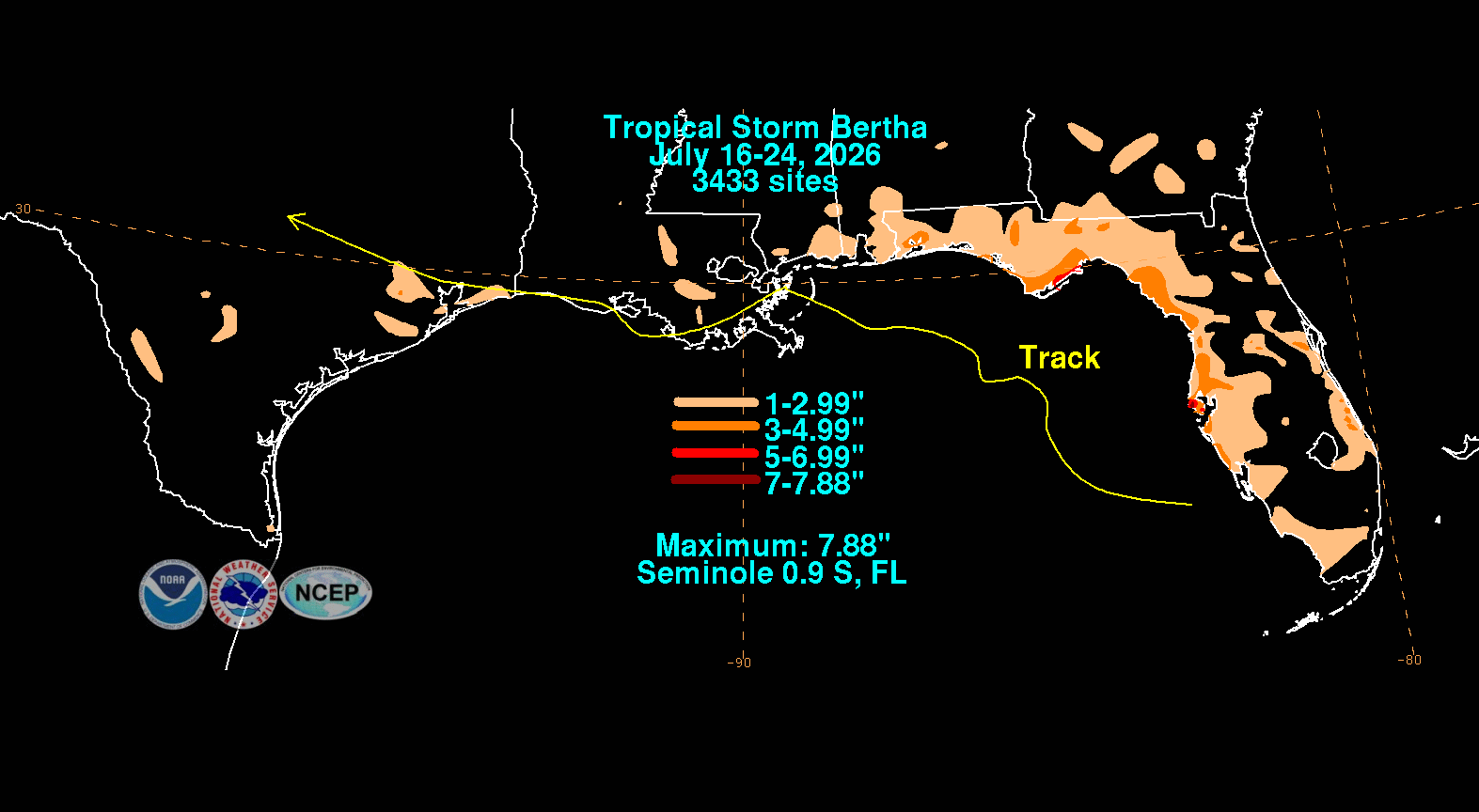
Rainfall map of Bertha according to the Weather Prediction Center.

The preceding low brought rains to the West Coast of Florida. Across three days prior to the formation of Bertha, St. Petersburg received over 6 inches (150 mm). Heavy winds and rains also occurred in the Florida panhandle, with a 43 mph (69 km/h) recorded in Pensacola Beach. Throughout Florida's Gulf Coast, Bertha generated increased swells. Multiple sea turtle nests were destroyed by the storm across northeast Florida, including St. George Island, Destin, and Panacea, with volunteers spending several hours searching for surviving sea turtle hatchlings. Fifteen nests were destroyed in only Escambia County. A park in Shalimar had to be closed after Bertha downed a power line and trees. Another park in Milton along with the city's riverwalk were closed due to flooding from storm surge. A boardwalk in Pensacola had to be closed due to damage from Bertha. Two state parks in the Florida Panhandle, St. Andrews State Park and T.H. Stone Memorial St. Joseph Peninsula State Park, were also shut down in the wake of the storm. A Waffle House's sign fell onto a car in Pensacola Beach.

A road along the Dog River was forced to close to flooding. Other roads in Mobile, Alabama, also became inundated by storm surge. Wind gusts in Dauphin Island reached 41 mph (66 km/h). Six automobiles became trapped in sand after storm surge from Bertha in Dauphin Island, while beach erosion and road closures also occurred. Waves measuring 9 feet (2.7 m) to 11 feet (3.4 m) impacted the coast at Orange Beach causing the issuance of double red flag warnings. The pier at Gulf State Park was closed due to damage from Bertha. In coastal Mississippi, gusts reached up to 40 miles per hour (64 km/h). Tidal flooding occurred in Biloxi and Ocean Springs.

In southeast Louisiana, wind gusts peaked at 63 mph (101 km/h) in Venice. Venetian Isles was partially inundated by water from canals. Part of Lakeshore Drive in New Orleans was flooded after waves from Lake Pontchartrain overtopped the seawall, overwhelming storm drains and causing street flooding. As the warm core of the storm moved over Lake Charles, the heat index reached 121 °F (49 °C) on July 22. This spell of extreme heat was partially caused by Bertha's asymmetrical shape, which could not inhibit temperatures through cloud cover. Bertha, through mixing layers of sea water, significantly reduced the size of the Gulf of Mexico dead zone to the second-smallest size in forty years.

Rainfall in parts of the Texas coast was about one–two inches (25–51 mm). Some flooding occurred in the region, particularly in areas without good drainage. The Starship flight test 13 launch by SpaceX at Starbase was postponed one day due to cloudy conditions caused by Bertha.

Bertha impacted the production of 7.1 million barrels of oil.

=== Elsewhere ===
Moisture from Bertha and a storm system over Ohio and West Virginia caused a flood threat for several states in the Southeastern United States away from the Gulf Coast. On July 22, five inches (130 mm) of rain fell near Knoxville, Tennessee in just a few hours. Portions of I-40 near Durham, North Carolina were briefly closed due to flooding on July 23. Rainfall in the state was largely beneficial, alleviating a prolonged drought.

== See also ==
- Other storms named Bertha
- Tropical cyclones in 2026
- Weather of 2026
- List of Florida hurricanes (2000–present)
- List of Louisiana hurricanes
- List of Texas hurricanes (1980–present)
