= List of storms named Bertha =

The name Bertha has been used for eleven tropical cyclones worldwide: nine in the North Atlantic Ocean and one each in the South-West Indian Ocean and the Australian region.

In the Atlantic Ocean:

- Tropical Storm Bertha (1957), a moderate tropical storm that threatened areas devastated by Hurricane Audrey two months earlier, but did not become a hurricane and caused only minor damage
- Tropical Storm Bertha (1984), a minimal tropical storm that formed in the mid-Atlantic and never threatened land
- Hurricane Bertha (1990), a Category 1 Hurricane that moved north, parallel to the east coast of the United States before dissipating over Nova Scotia leaving nine dead, including six on a ship sunk by the storm
- Hurricane Bertha (1996), a Category 3 hurricane that crossed the Leeward Islands and passed near Puerto Rico, later making landfall in North Carolina as a Category 2 storm, causing $270 million in damage to the United States and resulted in many indirect deaths
- Tropical Storm Bertha (2002), a minimal tropical storm that formed only two hours before landfall in Louisiana, dissipated, exited back into the Gulf of Mexico, striking South Texas as a Tropical Depression. Bertha caused minimal damage, and one person drowned
- Hurricane Bertha (2008), a long-lived Category 3 hurricane
- Hurricane Bertha (2014), a Category 1 hurricane that affected the Antilles and the East Coast of the United States, and whose remnants affected Western Europe
- Tropical Storm Bertha (2020), a pre-season tropical storm that formed only an hour before making landfall in South Carolina
- Tropical Storm Bertha (2026), a moderately strong and erratic tropical storm that paralleled the Gulf Coast of the United States before making landfall in Louisiana and Texas.

In the South-West Indian:

- Cyclone Bertha (1962), a fairly strong tropical cyclone which passed between Rodrigues and Réunion

In the Australian Region:

- Cyclone Bertha (1964), a relatively short-lived tropical cyclone that had no known major impacts

== See also ==
- Tropical Storm Bentha (1995), a similarly-named storm which caused minor impacts in the Mascarene Islands
