= List of Louisiana hurricanes =

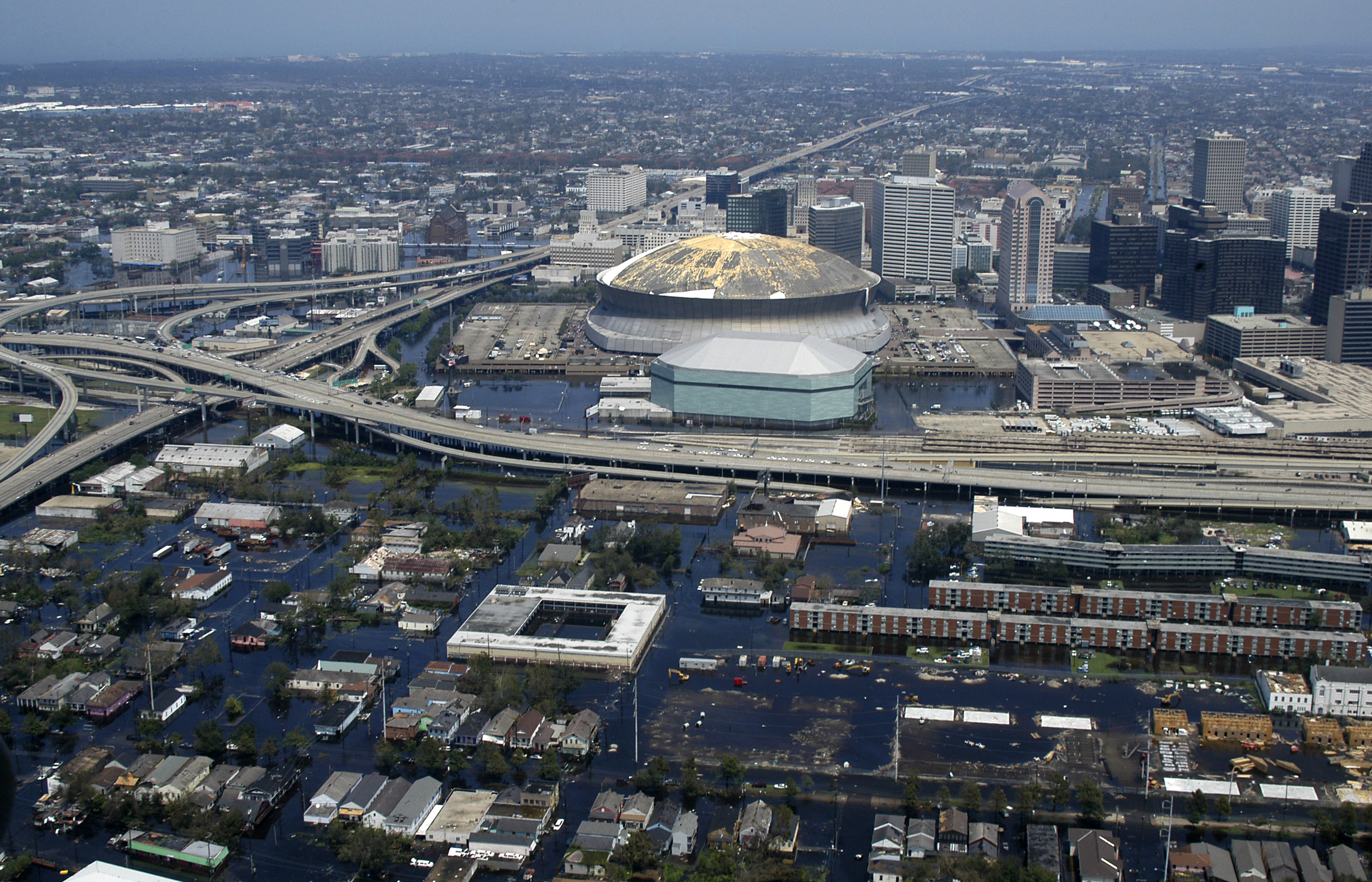
Flooding in Downtown New Orleans caused by Hurricane Katrina

From 1851 to the present, at least 200 tropical or subtropical cyclones affected the U.S. state of Louisiana. According to David Roth of the Hydrometeorological Prediction Center (HPC), a tropical cyclone makes landfall along the coastline about two times every three years, and a hurricane makes landfall once every 2.8 years.

The most intense storm to make landfall in the state in terms of barometric pressure is Hurricane Katrina of 2005 which is also tied with Hurricane Harvey of 2017 as the costliest hurricane in the Atlantic basin. The deadliest hurricane in the state was the 1893 Cheniere Caminada hurricane, which killed an estimated 2000 people. The 2020 hurricane season saw the most landfalling tropical cyclones in a single season with five total storms. In terms of wind speed, Hurricane Camille was the strongest storm to affect the state, producing maximum sustained winds above 160 mph (260 km/h), equivalent to Category 5 on the Saffir–Simpson hurricane scale.

== Pre–1900 ==
- October 23, 1527 – A hurricane made landfall at the mouth of the Mississippi River.
- September 22-24, 1722 – A hurricane made landfall in New Orleans. Food crops were lost and ships in the harbor sunk.
- September 23, 1740 – A hurricane struck the mouth of the Mississippi. The settlement of La Balize was sunk, and the inhabitants moved to the island of San Carlos, which surfaced in the hurricane.
- September 2, 1772 – A hurricane struck in Louisiana, west of Mobile, Alabama.
- August 1793 – A hurricane struck New Orleans, destroying crops and devastating rural sections of Louisiana.
- August 31, 1794 – A hurricane originating in Cuba struck New Orleans, resulting in crop damage. The storm surge moved inland to Plaquemines, resulting in storm surge up to 10 feet. Fort St. Phillip was completely engulfed, and the chief engineer drowned. Large hail and high winds killed many cattle and horses.
- 1811 – A hurricane was recorded in New Orleans.
- August 19–20, 1812 – The 1812 Louisiana hurricane hit the area just west of New Orleans.
- August 19, 1813 – A hurricane affected the Gulf Coast.
- August 10, 1856 – The Last Island hurricane struck the state south of New Iberia with winds of 150 mph (240 km/h), making it the strongest hurricane on record in the state. There were at least 218 fatalities in the state. The resort city of Last Island was destroyed, while New Orleans recorded 13.14 in (334 mm) of rainfall.
- August 11, 1860 – A hurricane hit southeastern Louisiana, killing 47 people. Damages totaled $260,000.
- October 1, 1893 – A powerful hurricane struck and destroyed the fishing village of Cheniere Caminada, killing around 2,000 people in the state.

== 1900s ==
- September 8, 1900 – The Galveston hurricane made landfall in Cameron with the winds of 85.6 miles per hour (137.8 km/h). the storm produced gale-force winds as far inland as Far East as New Orleans metropolitan area.
- September 14, 1900 - A tropical storm produced 1.3 miles per hour (2.1 km/h) sustained winds. the storm damaged growing rice in Cameron Parish.
- August 14, 1901 - The Louisiana hurricane hit Grand Isle, and winds reached 56 miles per hour (90 km/h) before the wind gauge blew away. Ten people were killed; damage exceeded $1 million.
- September 20, 1909 - The Grand Isle hurricane struck south Louisiana with winds of 80 miles per hour (130 km/h) reported in Thibodaux. The storm, which reportedly tracked between New Orleans and Baton Rouge, packed a 15-foot storm surge and killed 353 people. Damage totaled $6 million.
- September 29, 1915 - The Galveston hurricane struck the New Orleans area and produced a storm surge in excess of 12 feet on the northern coast of Grand Isle. Winds were clocked at 130 miles per hour (210 km/h), and reports showed 99 of 100 buildings in Leeville were destroyed. The storm killed 275 people and caused $13 million in damage.
- June 27, 1957 – Hurricane Audrey made landfall in Cameron Parish with winds of 125 mph (201 km/h). Audrey brought tides as high as 12.4–3 ft (3.78–0.91 m) to the coast of the state, causing devastating damage and killing over 400 people. The highest rainfall reported in the state was 10.63 in (270 mm) near Basile.
- September 9, 1965 – Hurricane Betsy made landfall at Grand Isle with winds of 130 mph (210 km/h). More than 27,000 homes in the state were destroyed by Betsy. 58 people were killed and damage totaled over $1.4 billion.
- August 26, 1992 – Hurricane Andrew made landfall near Morgan City as a Category 3 hurricane with winds of 115 mph (185 km/h), producing around $1 billion in damage as a result of high winds, rainfall, and storm surge. 11.92 in (303 mm) of rain was recorded in Hammond, and tides reached 8 ft (2.4 m) in Cocodrie. In total, 17 deaths were reported.
- October 4, 1995 – Hurricane Opal brought gale-force winds and a moderate storm surge of 3 to 5 ft (0.91–1.52 m) to portions of coastal Louisiana while passing east of the state.
- October 5–8, 1996 – Distant Tropical Storm Josephine brought strong winds and increased tidal flooding along the coastline of the state.
- July 18, 1997 – Hurricane Danny made a brief landfall in Plaquemines Parish as a Category 1 hurricane, producing rainfall up to 11.40 in (290 mm) in Buras, and a storm surge up to 5.4 ft (1.6 m) in Grand Isle.
- September 10–14, 1998 – Whilst making landfall in Texas, the outer rainbands of Tropical Storm Frances brought high winds and heavy rain to Louisiana, with up to 21.10 in (536 mm) of rain being recorded in Terrytown. Numerous tornadoes also occurred across the state, one of which killed a person in Lafourche Parish.
- September 20, 1998 – Tropical Storm Hermine made landfall near Cocodrie as a minimal tropical storm, producing only minor impacts.
- September 27–28, 1998 – Hurricane Georges brought strong winds and a damaging storm surge to southeastern Louisiana after making landfall in Mississippi as a Category 2 hurricane. Water levels up to 8.9 ft (2.7 m) above normal were recorded east of Pointe à la Hache, and significant erosion occurred to the Chandeleur Islands. Three indirect deaths were reported.

== 2000–2009 ==
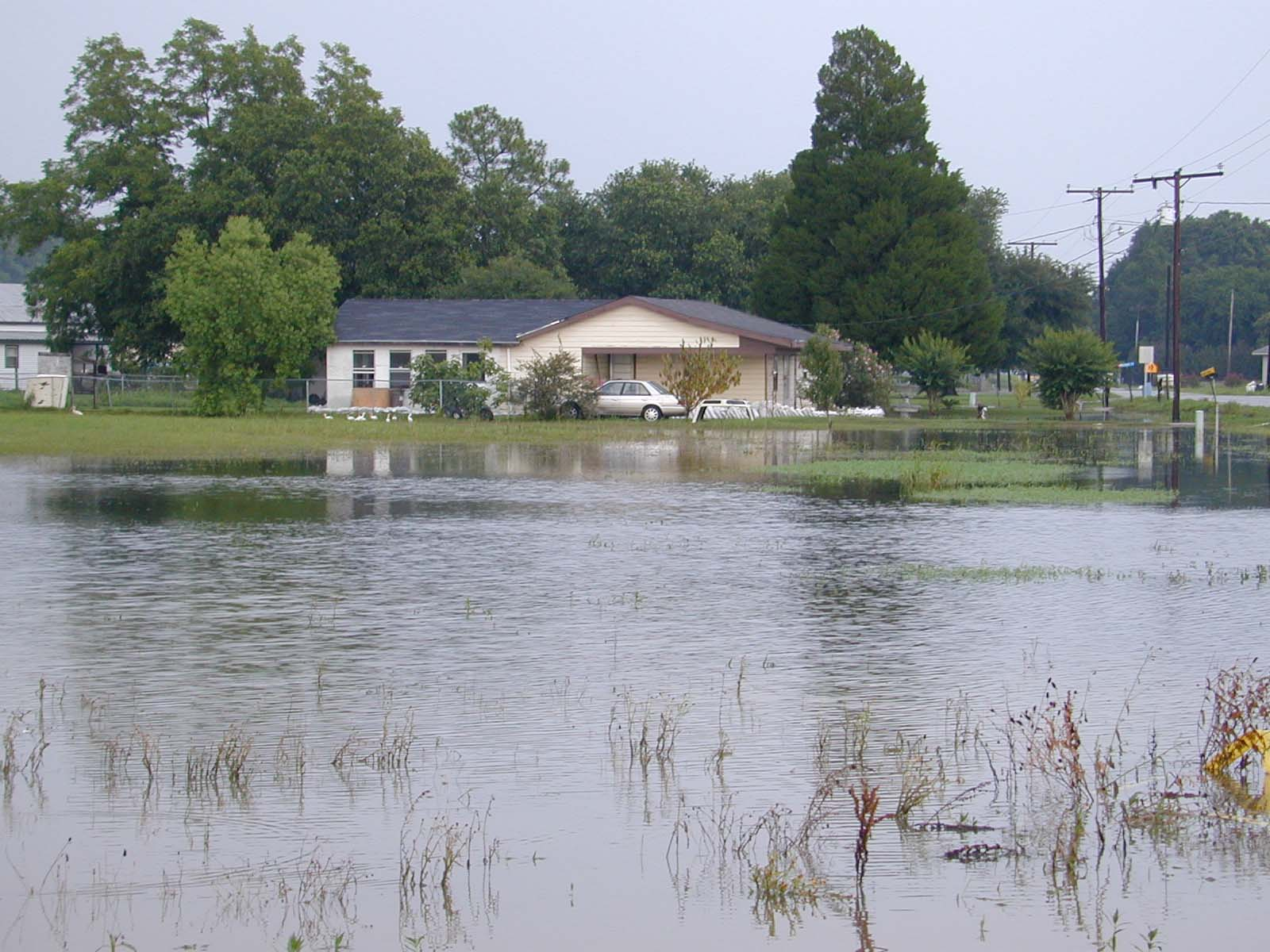
Flooding from Tropical Storm Allison in Chackbay

- September 9, 2000 – Tropical Depression Nine made landfall near the Texas and Louisiana border as a tropical depression with winds of 30 mph (48 km/h). Although the depression made landfall on Texas, most of the rain associated with the system affected Louisiana, where rainfall peaked at 6.70 in (17.0 cm). At the coast, Tropical Depression Nine brought a storm surge peaking at 3 ft (0.91 m). In Terrebonne Parish, strong thunderstorm winds associated with the depression damaged trailers and boats in Bayou Black, resulting in $2,500 in damages.
- Early–June 2001 – Tropical Storm Allison made landfall near Freeport, Texas on June 5, consequently stalling over the state before moving offshore and subsequently making a second landfall on Morgan City as a subtropical depression on June 11 with winds of 30 mph (48 km/h) and a minimum pressure of 1,004 mbar (29.6 inHg). This resulted in catastrophic flooding across the state. Rainfall from Allison peaked at 29.92 in (76.0 cm) in Thibodaux, ranking as the second–wettest tropical cyclone in state history, only behind a hurricane in 1940. Major river flooding occurred in Amite River and Comite River, which experienced their highest water levels since 1983. Homes were destroyed and swept away by flooding across the state. In Zachary, a man was killed after a tornado knocked a tree onto his truck. Damages from Tropical Storm Allison in Louisiana alone totaled to $65 million.
- August 6, 2001 – Tropical Storm Barry caused tides of 2–3 ft (0.61–0.91 m) along the southeastern coast of Louisiana before it made landfall on Santa Rosa Beach, Florida on August 6. Prior to making landfall, tropical storm watches and warnings were issued along the Gulf Coast, west to New Orleans.
- August 5, 2002 – Tropical Storm Bertha made landfall on Boothville as a minimal tropical storm with wind speeds of 40 mph (64 km/h) and a minimum pressure of 1,008 mbar (29.8 inHg), moving across Louisiana as a weakening system before moving back into the Gulf of Mexico on August 7. The storm dropped scattered rainfall across the state, peaking southwest of Franklinton at 10.25 in (26.0 cm). Streets were flooded by the heavy rainfall in Slidell. In St. Tammany Parish, surface runoff from flash flooding caused some rivers to exceed flood stage. Damage in Louisiana totaled to $150,000 (2002 USD, $260,000 2024 USD).
- September 5, 2002 – Tropical Storm Fay developed offshore the Louisiana coast before making landfall in Texas as a moderate tropical storm. West of Cameron, Fay caused a storm surge as high as 2.5 ft (0.76 m), resulting in minor beach erosion and coastal highway flooding. Tropical Storm Fay's outer rainbands dropped light rainfall over eastern and southern portions of the state, peaking at 4.64 in (11.8 cm) in Grand Isle. Prior to making landfall, a tropical storm warning was issued for western parts of Louisiana east to Intracoastal City.
- September 14, 2002 – Tropical Storm Hanna made landfall near the mouth of the Mississippi River as a moderate tropical storm with winds of 50 mph (80 km/h), before subsequently making landfall on the border between Alabama and Mississippi. Despite making landfall in Louisiana, as a result of convection displaced east of the center, the state received primarily minimal effects from Hanna. No significant flooding resulted from high tides caused by the storm. Rainfall was confined to extreme eastern portions of the state, where rainfall peaked at 1.72 in (4.4 cm) in Sondeheimer, Louisiana.

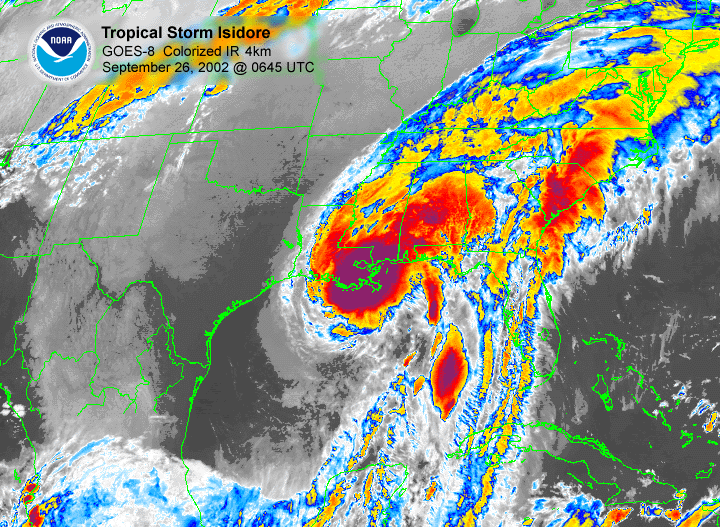
Tropical Storm Isidore making its Louisiana landfall

- September 26, 2002 – Hurricane Isidore made landfall just west of Grand Isle as a Tropical Storm with winds of 65 mph (105 km/h), having significantly weakened after stalling over the Yucatán Peninsula. Rainfall was widespread across the state, peaking at 15.97 in (406 mm) in Metarie. The heavy rains caused the failure of drainage systems, leaving numerous streets flooded. In Terrebonne Parish, 200–300 homes were flooded. The rains also damaged large plots of sugar cane crop in Southwest Louisiana.
- October 3, 2002 – Hurricane Lili made landfall on the morning of October 3 near Intracoastal City, as a weakening Category 1 hurricane. Wind gusts reaching 120 mph (190 km/h), coupled with over 6 inches (150 mm) of rainfall and a storm surge of 12 feet (3.7 m) caused over $790 million (2002 USD) in damage to Louisiana. A total of 237,000 people lost power, and oil rigs offshore were shut down for up to a week. Crops were badly affected, particularly the sugar cane; damage totaled nearly $175 million (2002 USD). No direct deaths were reported as early warnings and the compact nature of the storm circumvented major loss of life.
- June 30, 2003 – Tropical Storm Bill brought a moderate storm surge peaking at 5.8 ft (1.8 m) at the Louisiana Universities Marine Consortium facility in Chauvin. In Montegut, the surge breached a levee that still was damaged from the effects of Hurricane Lili nine months before. The breach flooded many homes in the town, forcing the evacuation of an entire neighborhood. As a result, 150 homes in the town were damaged, with half of them severely. The storm surge affected numerous low-lying cities in southeastern Louisiana by flooding roadways, including the only road to Grand Isle, stranding residents and visitors. The floodwaters entered a few homes and businesses in St. Tammany Parish. Damage from the storm surge totaled to $4.1 million (2003 USD). Rough waves sank two boats offshore, though their occupants were rescued.
- August 31, 2003 – Tropical Storm Grace dropped light rainfall across the state.
- September 15–16 and September 22-23, 2004 – Around the time of Hurricane Ivan's initial landfall in Alabama, the storm produced wind gusts as strong as 100 mph (160 km/h) at the Southwest Pass of the Mississippi River. About 50 electrical poles were toppled. About a dozen structures in St. Bernard Parish were damaged. Storm surge flooded several low-lying areas in southeastern Louisiana. About 55,000 customers lost power during the storm. Four people died during evacuation and damage in the state reached roughly $7.9 million. The storm's second landfall in Holly Beach resulted in minor coastal flooding, with damage totaling only about $15,000. Inland, generally light rainfall was recorded.
- October 10, 2004 – Tropical Storm Matthew caused a storm surge of up to 5.85 ft (1.78 m) in Frenier, Louisiana. The storm surge and waves resulted in significant beach erosion in Grand Isle. Portions of Louisiana experienced significant rainfall, including a peak of 18 inches (460 mm) in Haynesville. In addition, a tornado caused damage to the roof of a trailer in Golden Meadow. Rainfall and storm surge flooded 20 homes in Terrebonne Parish. In addition, several homes in Lafouche Parish experienced flooding, including two with over two feet of water. Numerous homes in Golden Meadow experienced flooding, as well. The flooding also forced the temporary closing of numerous roads across the state, including portions of Route 11 and Interstate 10. Flood waters from the storm cracked a water line in LaPlace, leaving nearly 30,000 residents and many businesses without tap water. The problem was expected to take little time to fix, though residents were advised to boil the water before drinking it. Matthew also left 2,500 people without power for a short period of time. The storm's impact also closed several schools. In all, Matthew caused $255,000 in damage (2004 USD).

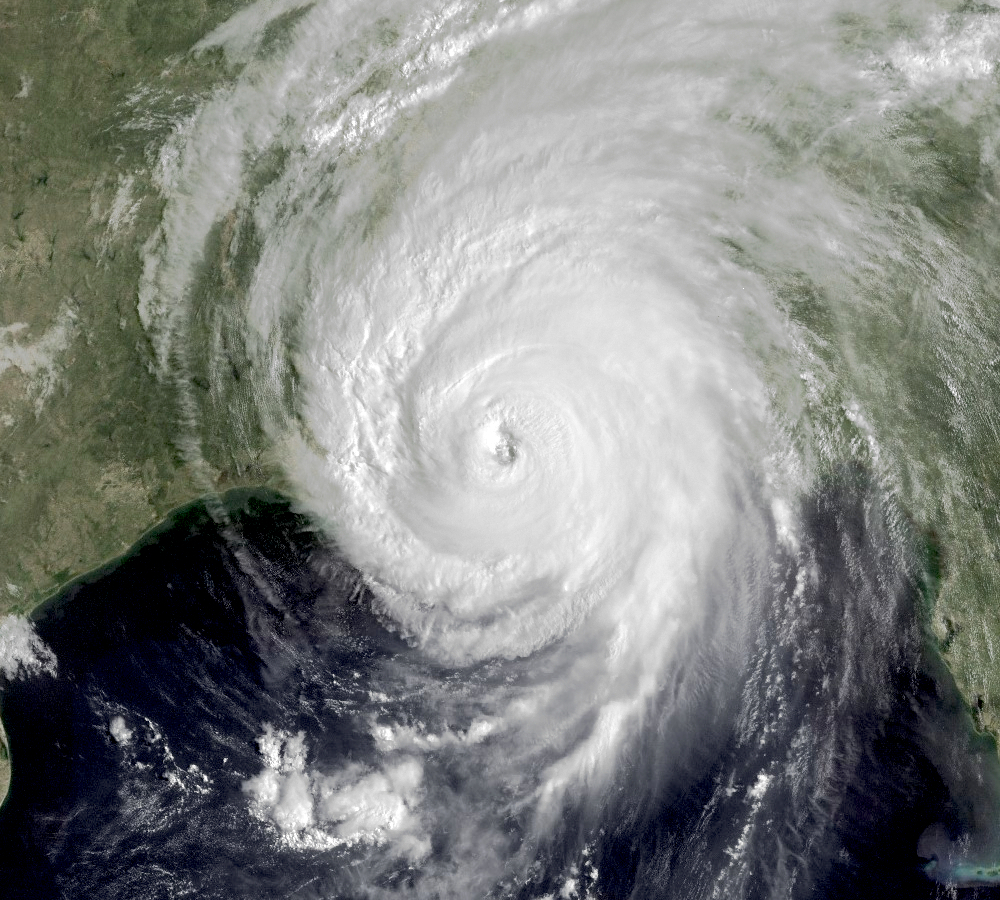
Hurricane Katrina making landfall on Louisiana

- July 5, 2005 – Hurricane Cindy brought wind gusts of 70 mph (110 km/h) to New Orleans, downing many trees. Rainfall also left scattered street flooding. With thousands losing electrical power, the city experienced its worst blackout since Hurricane Betsy in 1965, only to be trumped by Hurricane Katrina less than eight weeks later.
- July 10, 2005 – Hurricane Dennis produced light precipitation and a wind gust of 47 mph (76 km/h) at Lakefront Airport in New Orleans.
- August 29, 2005 – Although Hurricane Katrina's eye came ashore in lower Plaquemines Parish Louisiana, the resulting storm surge resulted in multiple levee failures in the New Orleans area, flooding approximately 80% of the city, with some places being inundated by more than 15 ft (4.6 m) of water. The failures of the levees were considered the worst engineering disaster in the history of the United States. Thousands of people were stranded inside their homes or on rooftops and required rescue from boats and helicopters. Many buildings and homes were damaged, with 134,000 housing units – approximately 70% of residences in New Orleans – impacted to some degree. The Superdome, which was sheltering many people who had not evacuated, sustained significant damage. Two sections of the Superdome's roof were compromised and the dome's waterproof membrane had essentially been peeled off. The famous French Quarter and Garden District escaped flooding because those areas are above sea level. A total of 573 deaths occurred in New Orleans alone.
  Several other parishes were severely impacted by the storm. Many areas outside of New Orleans also suffered wind damage, especially St. Tammany and Washington parishes. According to the United States Department of Housing and Urban Development, in St. Bernard Parish, 81% (20,229) of the housing units were damaged. In St. Tammany Parish, 70% (48,792) were damaged, and in Plaquemines Parish 80% (7,212) were damaged. Nearly 900,000 Louisianians were left without electricity. Throughout the state, 1,577 fatalities were reported. Overall, it is estimated that Hurricane Katrina caused $108 billion in damage throughout the Southern United States, with much of the damage occurring in Louisiana and Mississippi.
- September 24, 2005 – Hurricane Rita made landfall as a Category 3 hurricane on the Texas-Louisiana border with maximum sustained winds of 115 mph. Devastaing storm surge destroyed coastal communities in Cameron Parish such as Holly Beach, but only one person was killed throughout the state due to mass evacuations which were heeded in the wake of the devastation wrought by Katrina nearly a month prior to New Orleans. Damage totaled at least $8 billion throughout the state.
- September 13, 2007 – Hurricane Humberto passed through the state as a weakening tropical storm after making landfall at High Island, Texas as a Category 1 hurricane. Damage and impacts were fairly limited across the state.
- September 22, 2007 – Tropical Depression Ten was the first tropical cyclone to directly threaten New Orleans since Katrina. Damage and impacts were generally limited across the state, however.
- August 4, 2008 – Tropical Storm Edouard made landfall near Gilchrist, Texas with maximum sustained winds of 65 mph. Tropical storm force winds occurred in several locations across southwest Louisiana, but impacts were limited in scope.
- September 1, 2008 – Hurricane Gustav reached the Louisiana coast on the morning of September 1, making landfall near Cocodrie, Louisiana as a Category 2 with maximum sustained winds of 105 mph. The center of the storm continued northwest across the state resulting in significant damage and 7 deaths; 34 parishes were declared as disaster areas.
- September 13, 2008 – Hurricane Ike made landfall on Galveston Island in Texas as a large, high-end Category 2 with maximum sustained winds of 110 mph. Significant storm surge occurred across the southwest Louisiana coast and 6 people died across the state from the storm.
- November 10, 2009 – Hurricane Ida passed by the southeast Louisiana coast as a weakening tropical storm before making landfall near Dauphin Island, Alabama.

== 2010–2019 ==
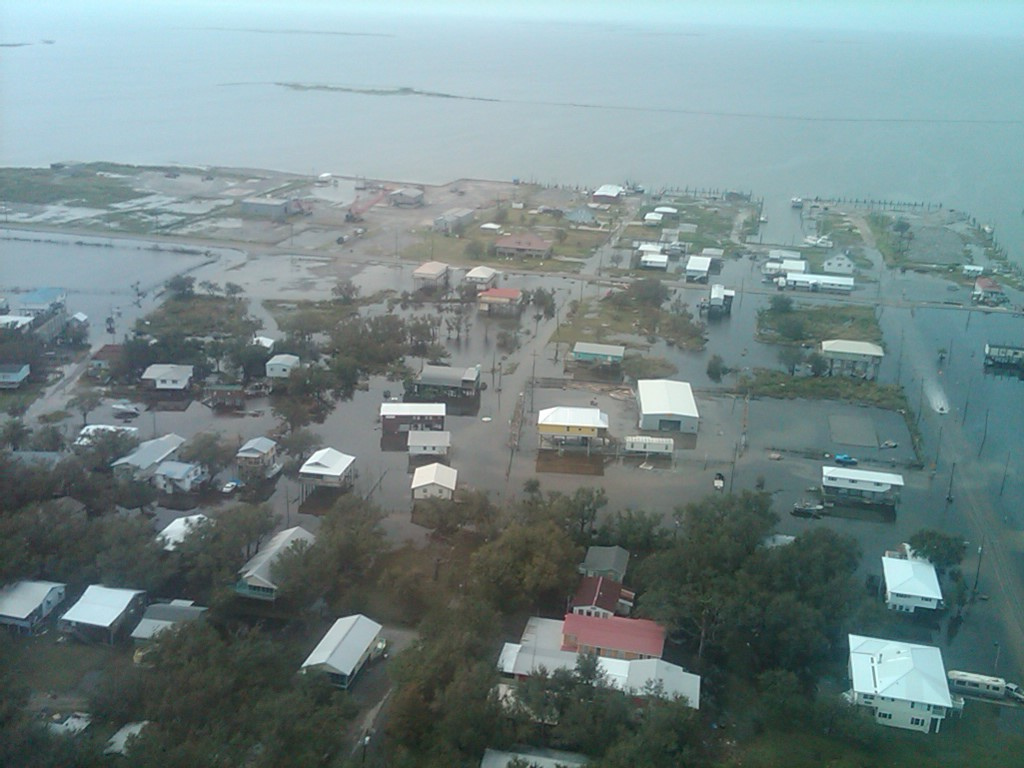
Grand Isle inundated after the passage of Hurricane Isaac in August 2012

- July 25–26, 2010 – The remnants of Tropical Storm Bonnie produced a localized heavy rain event on July 25, with 8 to 9 in (200 to 230 mm) of rain falling in West Baton Rouge Parish. More than 100 homes were flooded and 20 bridges and roads were washed away. Severe weather related to the system caused further damage the following day. In all, damage from Bonnie amounted to $810,000.
- Mid–August 2010 – Tropical Depression Five – The remnants of Tropical Depression Five made two separate landfalls within the state. Upon its classification as a Tropical Depression, the National Hurricane Center issued a tropical storm warning for much of southern Louisiana, including New Orleans. The storm ultimately dissipated prior to reaching the coastline, and the remnants of the cyclone produced riptides and strong waves along the coast. A local National Weather Service office issued flood watches for up to twelve Louisiana parishes. As the remnants of the cyclone regained strength in the Gulf of Mexico and approached the state for a second time, a coastal flood watch was issued for southern portions of the state. Up to sixteen hours of intense rain and thunderstorms flooded at least 40 buildings and structures in Avoyelles Parish, Louisiana.
- September 4, 2011 – Tropical Storm Lee – A state of emergency was declared for New Orleans ahead of Lee, with the threat of the storm prompting the preparation of rescue boats across the city and city officials ordering the closure of floodgates. Due to its slow and erratic motion across the state, Lee dropped torrential rainfall across much of southern Louisiana. Headwinds from the storm fanned a large and destructive fire in Natchitoches Parish, Louisiana, where about 400 acres of land were set ablaze and subsequently destroyed. In addition, several homes in Slidell were inundated by a four-foot storm surge. New Orleans also suffered sporadic power outages, but escaped with only minor flooding.
- June 23–24, 2012 – Initially forecast to brush the state as a hurricane, Tropical Storm Debby prompted a state of emergency. The storm ultimately tracked far right of early predictions and struck Florida. Several days of onshore flow led to a storm surge in southeastern areas of the state, peaking at 2.68 ft (0.82 m) in Shell Beach.
- August 29, 2012 – Hurricane Isaac – Isaac came ashore the state twice as a large Category 1 hurricane, producing an eleven-foot storm surge in Shell Beach. The storm produced sustained tropical storm-force winds and hurricane-force wind gusts in Grand Isle, leaving over 600,000 customers without power across the state. The city of LaPlace, St. John the Baptist Parish was one of the hardest hit areas. A lack of a hurricane levee system and 8–10 ft storm surge caused massive flooding of hundreds of homes. Over 3,000 residents had to be rescued from their homes. In addition, many pumping stations in Slidell were unable to keep up with rainfall rates and the city suffered flood damage as a result.
- October 6, 2013 – A state of emergency was declared ahead of Tropical Storm Karen; however, the storm dissipated over the northern Gulf of Mexico and had negligible effects in the state. Rainfall was predominantly less than 1 in (25 mm), with a localized peak around 3 in (76 mm).
- June 22, 2017 – Tropical Storm Cindy made landfall in extreme southwest Louisiana just east of Sabine Pass with maximum sustained winds of 50 mph, making it the first tropical cyclone to make landfall in the state since Hurricane Isaac in 2012.
- August 30, 2017 – Hurricane Harvey made its third and final United States landfall in the Sabine Pass as a weakened tropical storm causing significant flooding across southwest Louisiana.
- October 8, 2017 – Hurricane Nate made landfall in the Mississippi River delta with 85 mph winds causing some moderate damage.
- July 13, 2019 – Hurricane Barry made its first landfall at Marsh Island followed shortly thereafter with its second and final landfall near Intracoastal City as a minimal Category 1 hurricane with maximum sustained winds of 75 mph. Barry was one of four hurricanes to hit Louisiana at Category 1 intensity in the month of July, the others being Bob in 1979, Danny in 1997, and Cindy in 2005. Before Barry was classified as an official tropical system, it has dropped a total of 6 to 9 in (150 to 230 mm) of rainfall all across the city of New Orleans, caused flooding throughout the city. With fears that the levees won't support the rainfall rates from Barry combined with an already swollen Mississippi River, the United States Army Corps of Engineers issued a mandatory evacuation for Plaquemines Parish. The slow moving storm has dropped locally heavy rain with a peak total of 23.43 in (595 mm) near Ragley, Louisiana.
- October 26, 2019 – The remnants of Tropical Storm Olga produced 10–15 in (254–381 mm) throughout Southeastern Louisiana.

== 2020–present ==
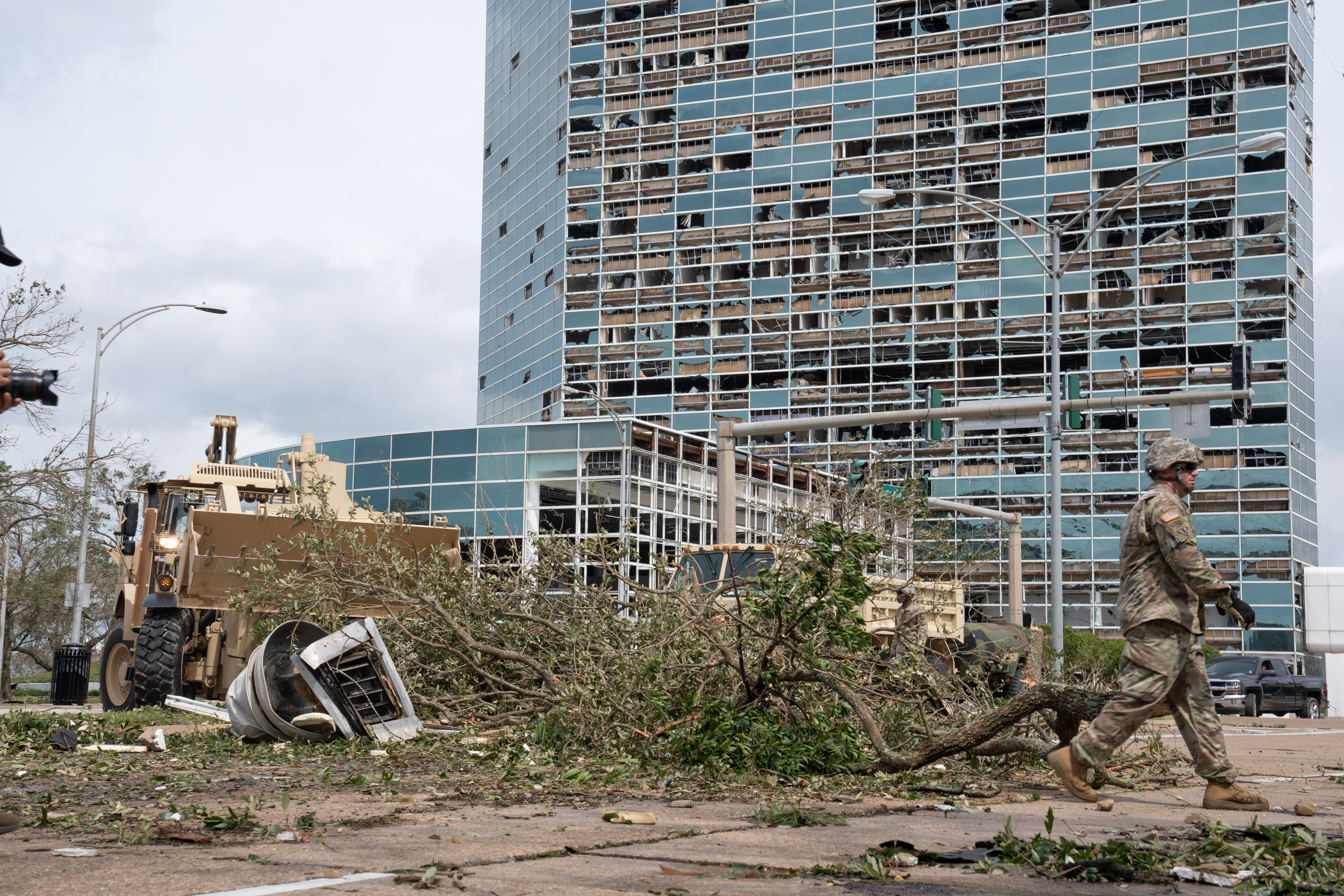
The Capital One Tower in Lake Charles was heavily damaged while the National Guard clears out debris all left behind from Hurricane Laura

- June 7, 2020 – Tropical Storm Cristobal made landfall east of Grand Isle with maximum sustained winds of 50 mph. Storm surge from Cristobal reached a total of 5 ft (1.5 m) along the coastline. Infrastructure damage to southern Louisiana totaled nearly $150 million.
- August 24, 2020 – Hurricane Marco, passed just south of the Mississippi River delta as a weak tropical storm.
- August 27, 2020 – Hurricane Laura, as a high-end Category 4 hurricane, made landfall near the Louisiana–Texas border in Cameron Parish and simultaneously tied the 1856 Last Island hurricane as the strongest tropical cyclone ever to make landfall in Louisiana with maximum sustained winds of 150 mph. Storm surge as high as 17 feet was measured at Rutherford Beach and a wind gust of 137 mph was recorded at Lake Charles. Widespread severe damage occurred across southwest Louisiana with coastal areas experiencing devastating storm surge and inland areas experiencing catastrophic wind damage. 33 people died in Louisiana from the storm and an estimated $17.5 billion in damage was inflicted across the state.
- October 9, 2020 – Hurricane Delta made landfall 15 miles east of where Laura made landfall as a Category 2 hurricane with maximum sustained winds of 100 mph. Delta hampered the ongoing recovery efforts from Laura which made landfall six weeks prior.
- October 28, 2020 – Hurricane Zeta made landfall near Cocodrie, Louisiana as a Category 3 hurricane with maximum sustained winds of 115 mph, with the eye passing directly over the entire city of New Orleans. Zeta also surpassed the 1921 Tampa Bay hurricane for the latest date in a calendar year in which a major hurricane has made landfall in the continental United States.
- June 19, 2021 – Tropical Storm Claudette formed near Houma, Louisiana and brought gusty winds and heavy rainfall to the southeastern portions of the state.
- August 29, 2021 – Hurricane Ida made landfall at Port Fourchon, Louisiana as a high-end Category 4 hurricane with maximum sustained winds of 150 mph, the same day as the 16th anniversary of Katrina making landfall in the state. 33 people were killed and at least $18 billion in insured damage was inflicted across the state.
- July 8, 2024 – Hurricane Beryl brought tropical storm-force conditions to the western portion of Louisiana after making landfall in Texas as a minimal hurricane bringing heavy rainfall and debris to some roads in Lake Charles and leaving over 20,000 people without power in Northwestern Louisiana. Two people were killed as a result of a tornado produced by Beryl.
- September 11, 2024 – Hurricane Francine made landfall at peak intensity in Terrebonne Parish, Louisiana as a Category 2 hurricane with maximum sustained winds of 105 mph, bringing damaging winds and flooding to southern portions of the state. More than 400,000 people were left without power as a result of the storm.
- June 17, 2026 - The remnants of Tropical Storm Arthur made impact in Louisiana. More than 2 feet of rain fell in 48 hours.
- July 22, 2026 – Tropical Storm Bertha made landfall in St. Bernard Parish with sustained winds of 45 mph, bringing damaging winds and flooding to south-eastern portions of the state.

== Monthly statistics ==
Number of recorded storms affecting Louisiana
Month	Number of storms
June	7
July	4
August	11
September	16
October	7
November	1

== Deadly storms ==
The following is a list of hurricanes that caused known deaths in the state.

Hurricanes causing known deaths in Louisiana
Name	Year	Number of deaths	Notes
"Chenière Caminada"	1893	2,000	
Katrina	2005	1,577	
Audrey	1957	400	
"Grand Isle"	1909	353	
"Last Island"	1856	200	
Ida	2021	30	
Laura	2020	30	
Gustav	2008	7	
Cristobal	2020	2	
Beryl	2024	2	
Allison	2001	1	
Isidore	2002	1	
Rita	2005	1	

== See also ==
- Atlantic hurricane season
- List of Atlantic hurricanes
- List of wettest known tropical cyclones affecting Louisiana
