= Instituto de Meteorología de Cuba =

National meteorological service of Cuba

- Abbreviation: INSMET
- Established: 12 October 1965 (61 years ago)
- Types: meteorological service
- Country: Cuba

The Instituto de Meteorología de Cuba (INSMET) in the governmental body monitoring meteorology and the oceans around Cuba. It is located under the Ministry of Science, Technology and the Environment.

== History ==
INSMET was founded October 12, 1965.

== Technology ==
INSMET has eight radars from Japan, the Soviet Union, and Germany. The technology used by INSMET is inhibited by the United States embargo against Cuba.

== Tasks ==
The organization has issued watches and warnings for tropical cyclones.

=== Divisions ===
The Group of Solar Radiation and Atmospheric Ozone of the Center of Physics is charged with monitoring of the ozone layer and ultraviolet radiation. It was founded in 1985 to research the effect of variations in level of ozone on hurricanes.
