= Tropical Storm Arlene (2005) =

Atlantic tropical storm

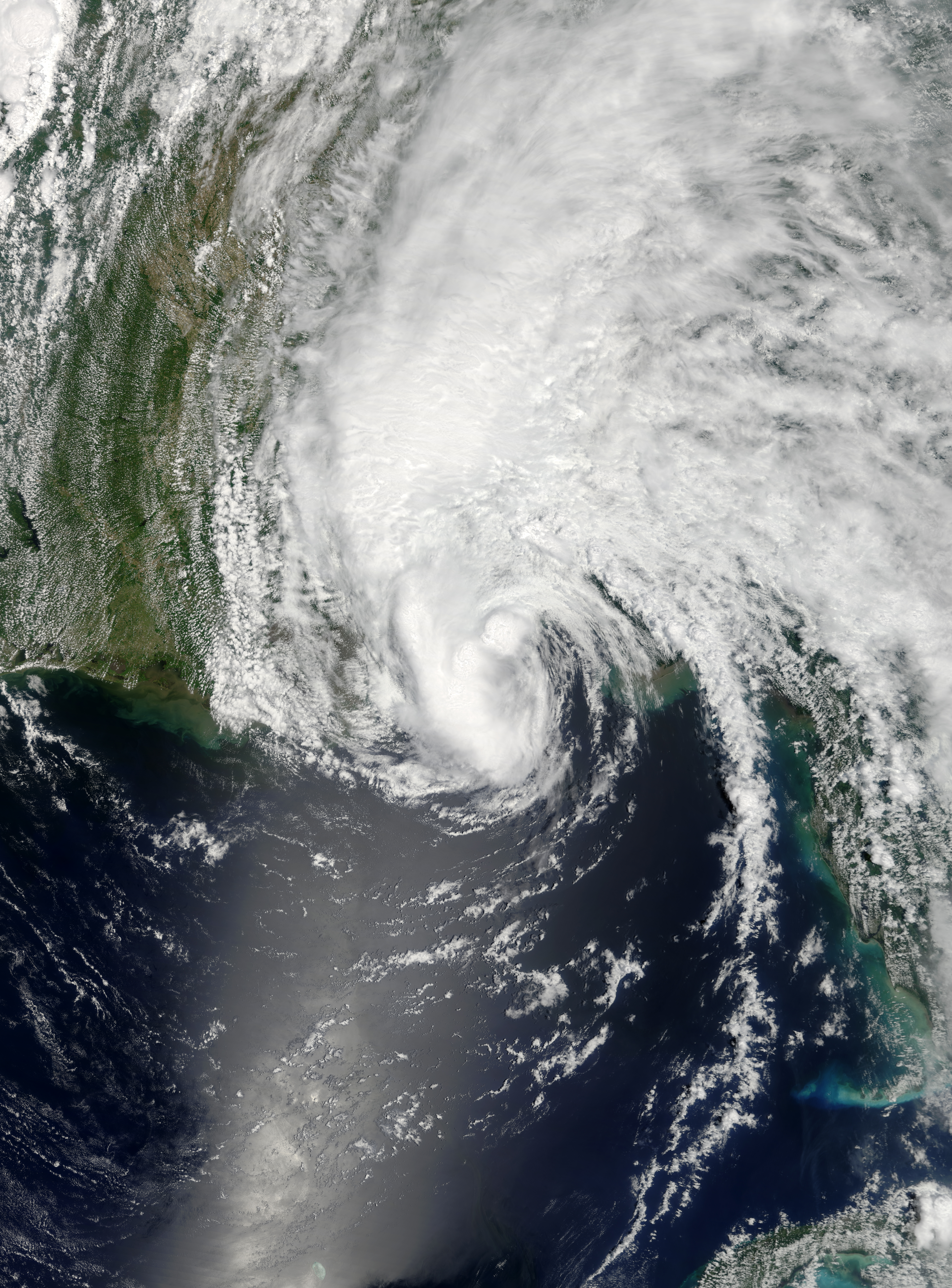
- Tropical Storm Arlene approaching Florida on June 11

Meteorological history
- Formed: June 8, 2005
- Extratropical: June 13, 2005
- Dissipated: June 14, 2005

Tropical storm
- 1-minute sustained (SSHWS/NWS)
- Highest winds: 70 mph (110 km/h)
- Lowest pressure: 989 mbar (hPa); 29.21 inHg

Overall effects
- Fatalities: 2 direct
- Damage: $11.8 million (2005 USD)
- Areas affected: Yucatán Peninsula, Cayman Islands, Cuba, Eastern United States, Eastern Canada
- IBTrACS
- Part of the 2005 Atlantic hurricane season

Tropical Storm Arlene was an unusually large and early-forming tropical storm, being the first of twenty-eight different storms during the 2005 Atlantic hurricane season, which would become the second most active season on record. Tropical Storm Arlene formed near Honduras on June 8 and moved northwards. It crossed western Cuba on June 10 and strengthened to just under hurricane strength before making its final landfall on the Florida Panhandle the next day. The storm weakened as it continued to move north over the United States, becoming extratropical on June 13. Arlene was responsible for two deaths and minor damage.

== Meteorological history ==
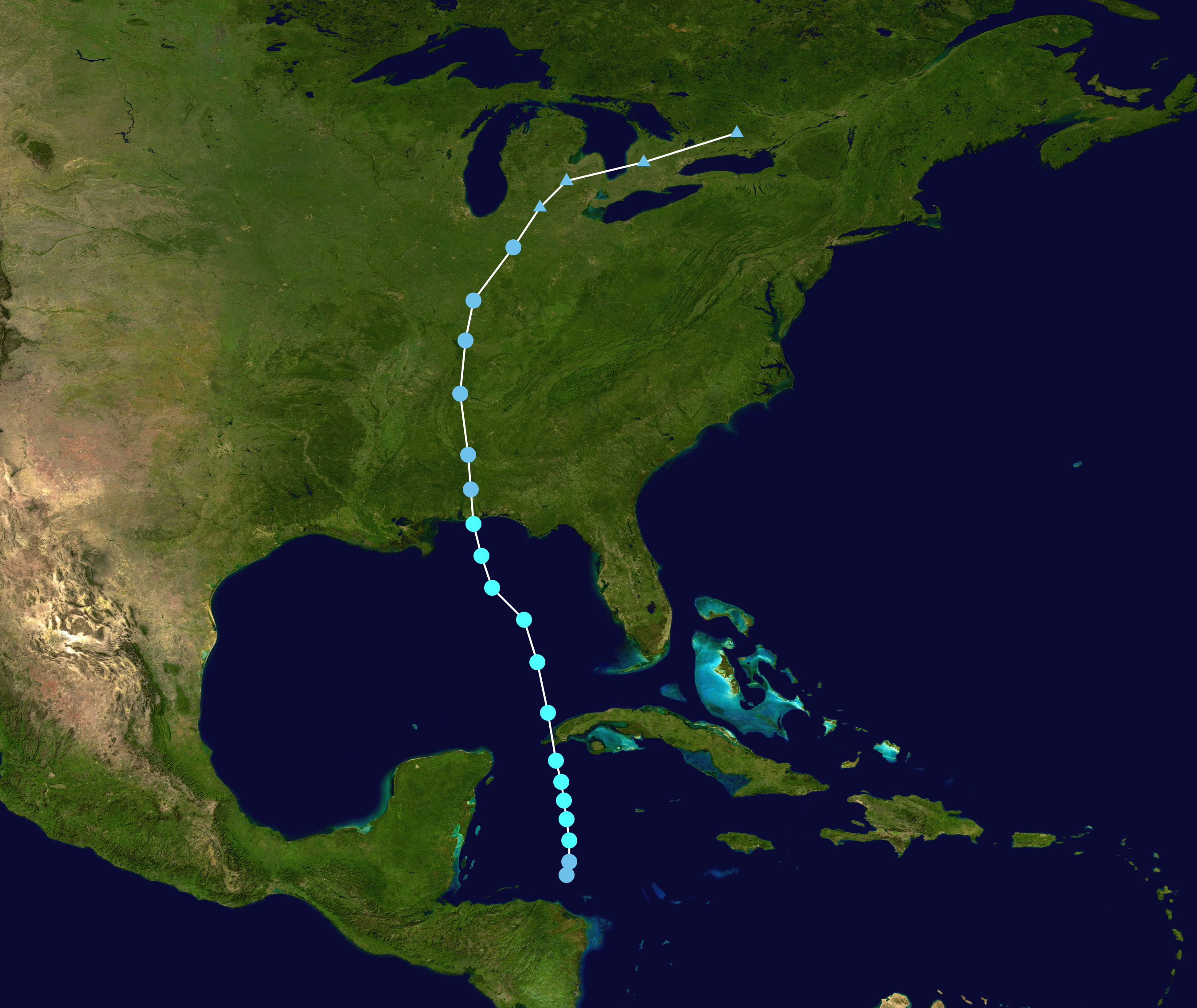
Map plotting the storm's track and intensity, according to the Saffir–Simpson scale Map key Saffir–Simpson scale Tropical depression (≤38 mph, ≤62 km/h) Tropical storm (39–73 mph, 63–118 km/h) Category 1 (74–95 mph, 119–153 km/h) Category 2 (96–110 mph, 154–177 km/h) Category 3 (111–129 mph, 178–208 km/h) Category 4 (130–156 mph, 209–251 km/h) Category 5 (≥157 mph, ≥252 km/h) Unknown Storm type Tropical cyclone Subtropical cyclone Extratropical cyclone, remnant low, tropical disturbance, or monsoon depression

Tropical Storm Arlene seemingly originated from the interaction between two tropical waves and the Intertropical Convergence Zone (ITCZ) over the western Caribbean in early June 2005. The ITCZ, initially focused over Central America in the first days of the month, became more convective when the first wave arrived on June 5–6. Two days later, a stronger tropical wave moved through the western Caribbean, triggering pressure drops and the expansion of thunderstorm activity. The establishment of an upper-level ridge over this disturbance on June 8 led to a reduction in wind shear. The system became increasingly organized and the National Hurricane Center (NHC) marked the formation of Tropical Depression One at 18:00 UTC with the cyclone's center situated northeast of Honduras.

Hurricane Hunters investigating the system observed a poorly organized albeit closed circulation at this time with the strongest winds displaced to the north and east within banding features. The lopsided structure was the result of an upper-level trough over the Gulf of Mexico. Weak steering currents pushed the system along a slow northward trajectory. Early on June 9, notably deep convection organized into curved bands and signaled the system's intensification into a tropical storm by 06:00 UTC while situated 175 mi (282 km) west-southwest of the Cayman Islands. At this time, the NHC assigned the name Arlene to the cyclone.

The depression began to move northward toward western Cuba later that day, but as it was a very large and poorly organized system under the influence of high wind shear, the official forecasts from the National Hurricane Center emphasized that the route the storm would take was uncertain. Despite this uncertainty, the official forecasts were highly accurate in predicting the storm's track. As the shear dropped, the depression strengthened further and it became Tropical Storm Arlene on June 9. It produced precipitation over a very wide area; the Cayman Islands reported tropical storm-force winds and heavy rain over 150 statute miles (240 km) east of the center. Arlene crossed the western tip of Cuba on the morning of June 10 with 50 mph (80 km/h) winds. Tropical Storm Arlene had an unusual structure throughout its life, with a large circulation containing numerous small centers rotating about a larger gyre, as opposed to an inner convective core.

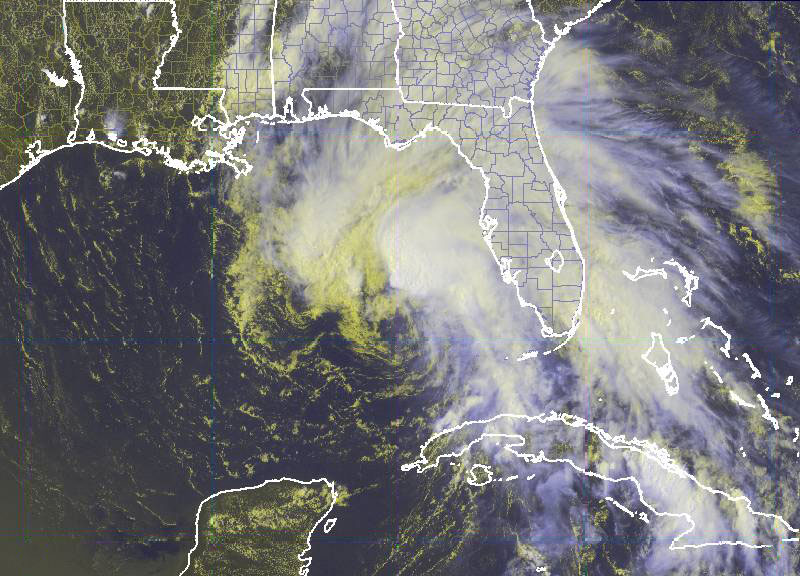
Tropical Storm Arlene near peak intensity on June 10

Arlene then entered the Gulf of Mexico later that afternoon and strengthened further to its peak strength of 70 mph (110 km/h). The official forecast at this time called for further intensification to minimal hurricane strength. This did not occur however and Arlene instead weakened as result of dry air entering the circulation. The storm made landfall just west of Pensacola, Florida in the afternoon of June 11 as a moderate tropical storm with winds of 60 mph (97 km/h). As most of the convection of the storm was located north and east of the center, most of the effects of the storm were on land long before it made landfall. Arlene was the most intense landfalling June storm since Hurricane Allison hit the same location as a strong tropical storm during the 1995 season. Arlene weakened into a tropical depression later that day, but managed to persist as a tropical system as it moved north over the United States. The storm finally became extratropical on June 13 just northeast of Flint, Michigan and was absorbed by a larger system the next day.

== Preparations ==
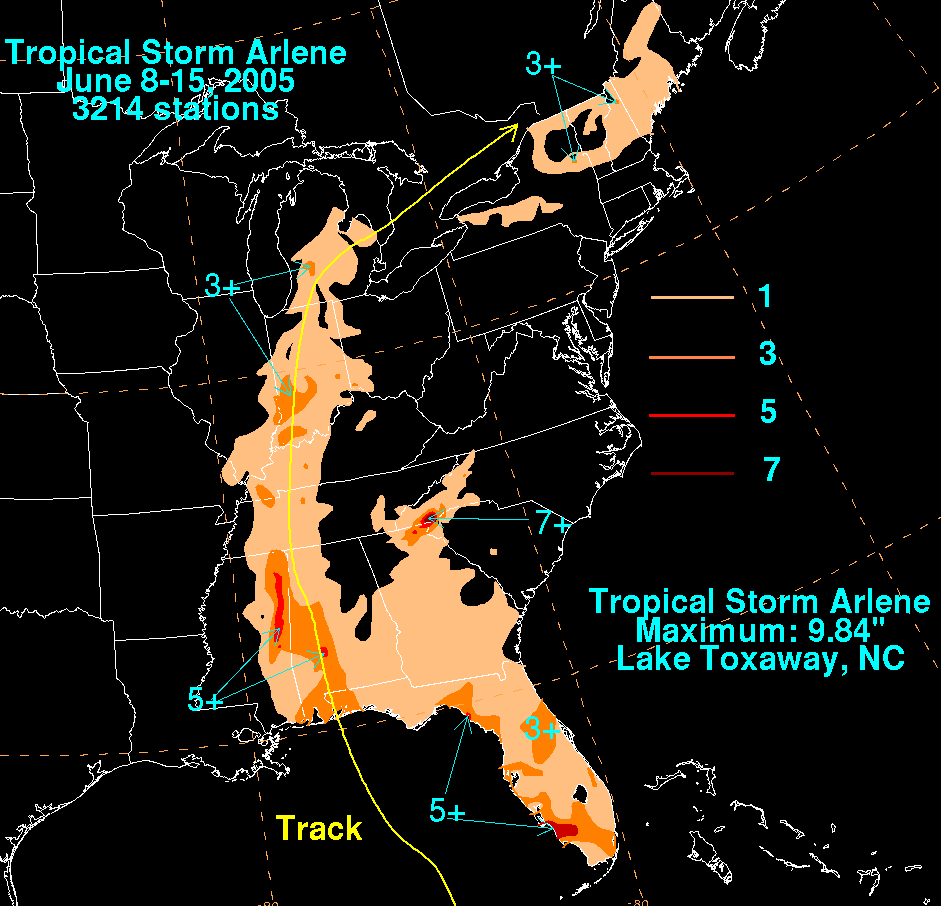
Rainfall totals from Arlene

While Arlene was over Cuba, a tropical storm watch was issued for the Gulf Coast from Morgan City, Louisiana to Indian Pass, Florida. Local branches of the National Weather Service issued coastal flood watches for Escambia and Santa Rosa counties. A general flood watch was issued for South Florida; heavy rains antecedent to Arlene left grounds saturated and prime for flooding. A tropical storm warning was issued for a stretch of coast slightly further east than the area covered by the preceding watch, and a hurricane watch was issued for the central section of the region. This turned into a hurricane warning from Pearl River, Louisiana to Indian Pass due to fears of the system strengthening to hurricane strength. The warnings were reduced and were then canceled eight hours after the second landfall.

County authorities in parts of Alabama held conferences on June 10 in anticipation of heavy rain from Tropical Storm Arlene. The Elmore County Emergency Management Agency had hundreds of sandbags ready for use.

Local officials in Escambia and Santa Rosa counties activated their emergency operations centers on June 10. Transportation department crews were dispatched to clear debris from storm drains and distribute sandbags where necessary. In accordance with a policy passed a week prior, FEMA began strapping down trailers provided for victims of Ivan shortly before the arrival of Arlene.

Still recovering from Hurricane Ivan which struck the Gulf Coast in September 2004, construction contractors and residents were forced to hasten home repair efforts in order to secure structures. Approximately 40,000 buildings in the Pensacola Bay area alone were covered by blue roof tarps. State Farm Florida Insurance Spokesman Tom Hagerty advised residents to thoroughly document possessions for potential claims related to Arlene as they would be treated as a separate claim from those related to Ivan. By June 10, homes in and around Pensacola were boarded up with plywood or storm shutters. Gas canisters, tarps, and generators were in high-demand at local stores. Debris from Ivan remained littered across Pensacola Beach, Perdido Key, and Navarre Beach.

Florida Governor Jeb Bush issued a state of emergency two days before the storm's final landfall. Recovery teams were also deployed to the area. An evacuation order was issued for all areas south of Gulf Beach Highway, including Pensacola Beach, Perdido Key, and Innerarity Point. Walton County officials issued a voluntary evacuation order for low-lying areas and mobile homes. Walton County also opened a shelter in Freeport, and four shelters and one special needs shelter were opened in Escambia County.

Two days prior to landfall, 36 oil platforms and 16 rigs were evacuated. The cumulative production loss caused from the evacuation of the storm totaled 0.109% of the yearly production, approximately 575 million barrels. The stopped rigs also accounted for 3.87% of the daily production on June 13.

== Impact ==
=== Caribbean ===
Arlene produced heavy rain across parts of Central America and the Cayman Islands during its developmental stages. Tropical storm warnings were briefly issued for the Cayman Islands on June 9. Meteorologists raised concerns over the possibility of flooding and mudslides in Honduras and Nicaragua. In Campeche, Mexico, heavy rain saturated soils and led to trees falling. One person was killed in the state and another was injured. Some flooding occurred in parts of Campeche City.

Upon the formation of Tropical Depression One on June 8, a tropical storm watch was issued for western Cuba and was soon upgraded to a tropical storm warning the next day. On June 9, the Instituto de Meteorología (Cuba) stated that western parts of Cuba, particularly Pinar del Río Province, would see impacts from Arlene. Approximately 50,000 people were evacuated across Cuba in preparation for Arlene. Fishermen were ordered to return to port and secure their vessels. Between June 9 and 10, Tropical Storm Arlene produced heavy rains over western areas of Cuba, leading to school closures in several cities. The area impacted by the rainfall was previously suffering from a severe drought and moisture brought in by Arlene helped alleviate the dry conditions. Tropical storm-force winds buffeted communities in western Cuba, with sustained winds peaking at 47 mph (76 km/h) in Punta del Este on Isla de la Juventud. Rainfall reached a maximum of 6.81 in (173 mm) in Pinar del Río on the mainland.

=== United States ===
==== Florida ====
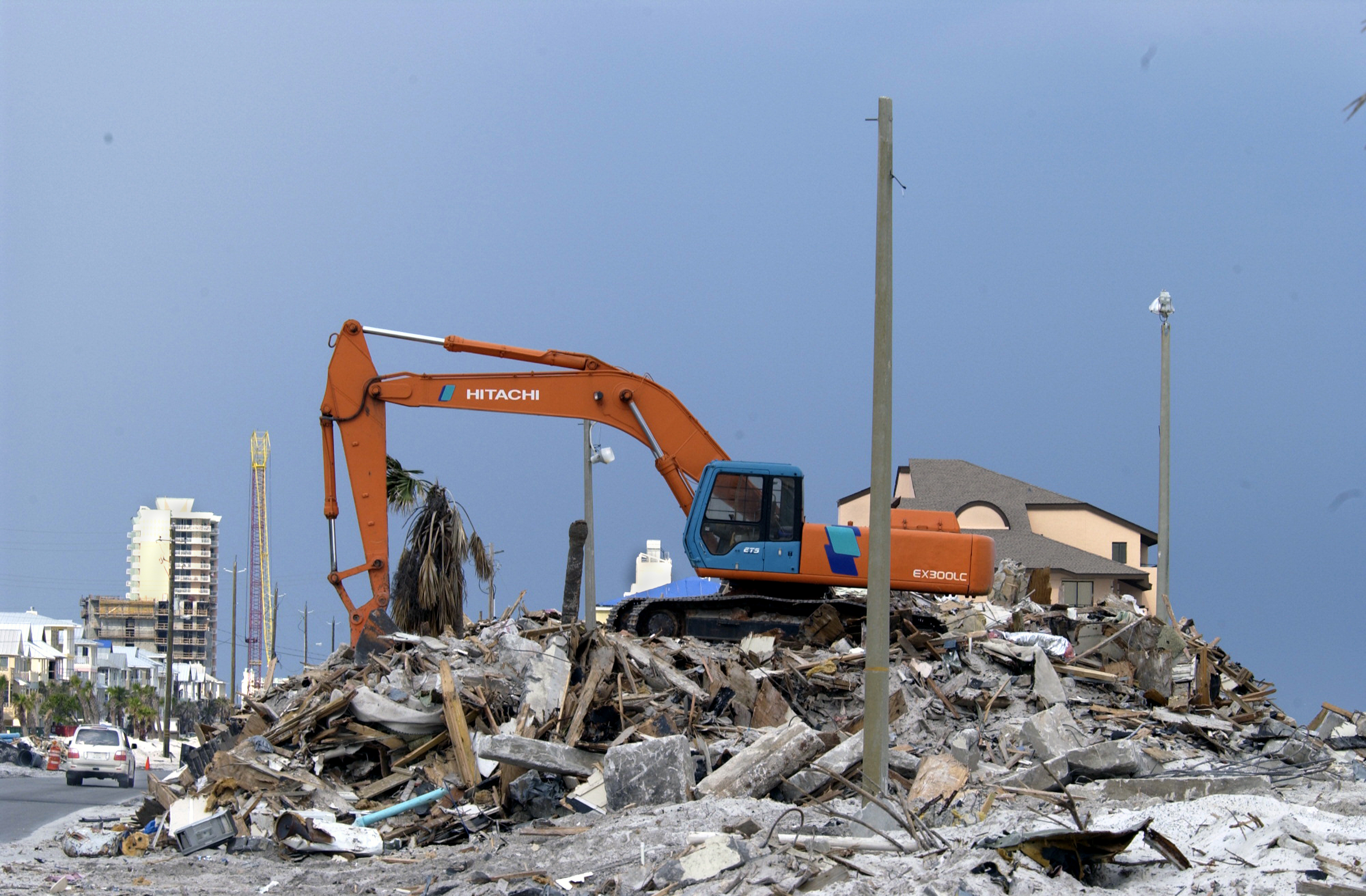
Heavy machinery clearing debris in Pensacola Beach on June 20

The outer edges of the storm brought tropical storm-force winds to South Florida. In the Florida Keys, Arlene produced wind gusts of up to 51 mph (82 km/h) on Duck Key and 47 mph (76 km/h) at Key West International Airport. Damage was limited to snapped tree limbs. At Fowey Rocks Light, offshore to the east of Key Biscayne, a gust of 55 mph (89 km/h) was observed. The only death attributed to Arlene was that of a woman caught in a rip current in Miami Beach, far from the center of circulation.

In the Florida Panhandle, the storm dropped heavy rainfall, peaking at 8.51 inches (216 mm) in Plantation Bay, Florida in Flagler County. Upon making landfall, Arlene caused a storm surge of up to 5 feet (1.5 m) in Walton County. Moderate beach erosion also occurred. Storm surge and strong waves caused moderate to severe damage to roads along the panhandle. Strong winds caused power outages to 500 people in Walton, Washington and Bay counties. The storm spawned a weak tornado in Navarre, Florida, causing minor damage on its 0.1-mile (0.2-km) path. Damage on the panhandle totaled to $3.5 million (2005 USD), $2.5 million of which was in Fort Pickens alone.

==== Alabama ====
Upon making landfall, the storm produced storm tides of up to 3.9 feet (1.2 m) in height. Minor beach erosion occurred as well. Arlene dropped moderate to heavy rainfall throughout Alabama, with higher totals of up to eight inches (200 mm) to the west of Interstate 65. four to six inches (100 to 150 mm) of rain fell in a three-hour period in the Mobile area. Several roads were temporarily impassable from the flooding, and one road was completely washed away. Wind speeds were around 20 to 30 mph (30 to 50 km/h), while wind gusts of over 60 mph (95 km/h) existed. The winds downed several trees and power lines, leaving thousands without power for several hours. With the storm following a path similar to Hurricane Ivan just nine months earlier, many trees damaged previously by Ivan were downed completely. In addition, several homes experienced light wind damage. The outer bands of the storm also caused numerous funnel clouds, though no tornadoes were reported. Overall, damage was light, amounting to $1.7 million (2005 USD).

==== Elsewhere ====
Heavy rainfall in Towns County, Georgia forced multiple residents to evacuate from rising flood water. Numerous creeks and rivers in the northern portion of the state overflowed.

Tropical Storm Arlene caused light rainfall across southeastern Mississippi, typically between 1 and 2 inches (25 and 51 millimetres). The effects were generally minimal.

In Indiana, the remnants of Arlene dropped heavy rainfall, peaking at 4.44 inches (113 mm) in Evansville. In Indianapolis, 3.04 inches (77 mm) fell at the International Airport. Rainfall from the storm was 85% of the typical June rainfall level. Arlene also spawned two tornadoes. An F1 tornado developed to the southwest of Hayden on June 12. The tornado damaged several buildings and trees on its 5.3-mile (8.5-km) path, with total damage amounting to $100,000 (2005 USD). Outer rainbands also developed an F0 tornado just south of Indianapolis, downing a few tree limbs.

The remnants of Arlene combined with a non-tropical system caused heavy rainfall across New York, with some locations reporting 6 to 7 inches (150 to 180 millimetres) of precipitation in a 2-hour period. The rainfall collected into streams and rivers, with some officials calling it a 1 in 500 year flood. Flash flooding caused at least one mudslide and damaged several roads. The flooding forced at least 20 people to evacuate their homes, and numerous houses were damaged. Strong winds also downed trees and power lines, causing scattered power outages. Damage totaled to $6.5 million (2005 USD).

== See also ==
- Tropical cyclones in 2005
- Other tropical cyclones named Arlene
- List of Florida hurricanes (2000–present)
- Tropical Storm Alberto (1994) – Affected similar areas with disastrous effects due to heavy rainfall and flooding
- Hurricane Cindy (2005) – Affected similar areas just a month later
- Tropical Storm Alberto (2018) – A pre-season storm that affected the similar areas
