= Tropical Depression Five (2010) =

Atlantic tropical depression

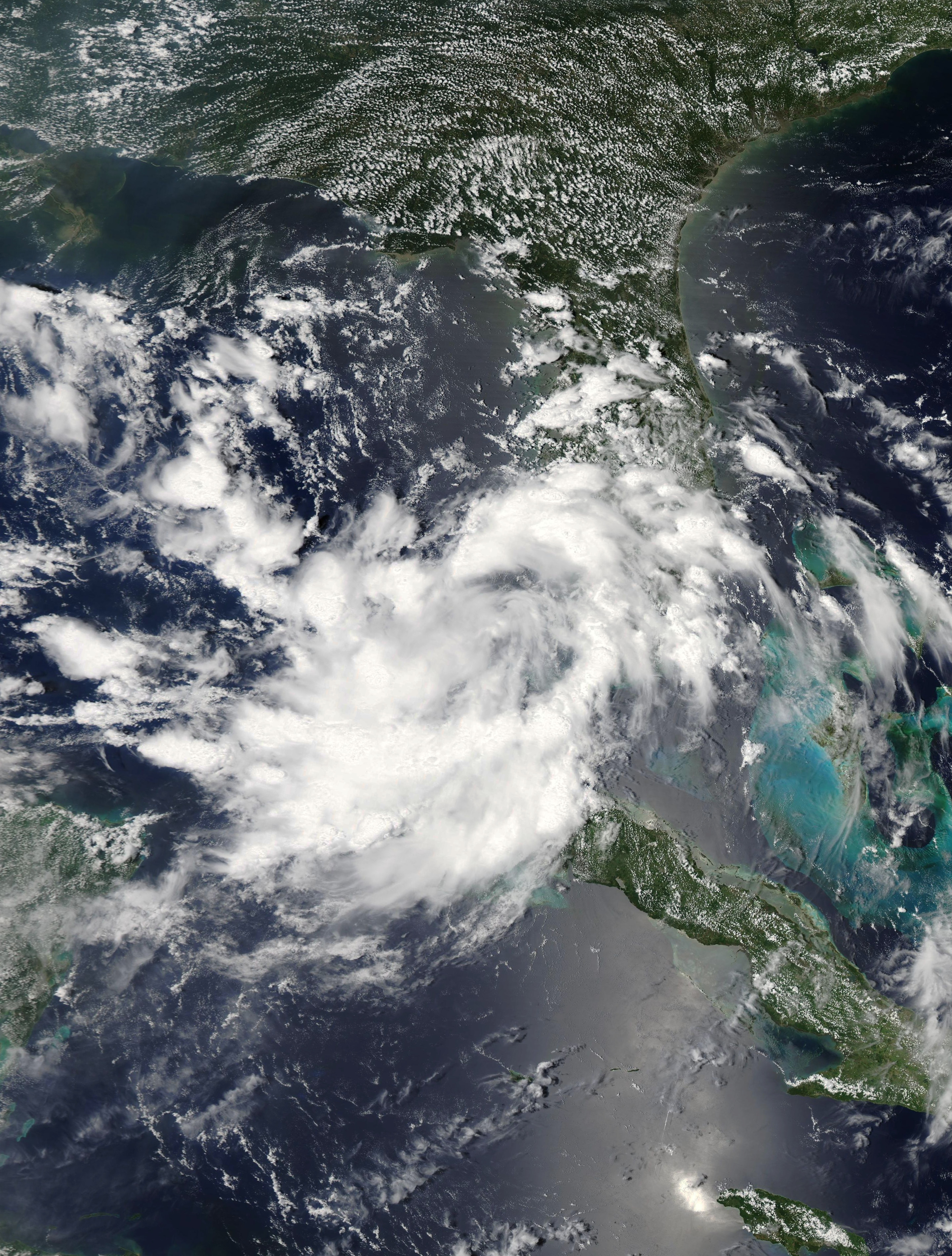
- Tropical Depression Five over the eastern Gulf of Mexico

Meteorological history
- Formed: August 10, 2010
- Remnant low: August 11, 2010
- Dissipated: August 18, 2010

Tropical depression
- 1-minute sustained (SSHWS/NWS)
- Highest winds: 35 mph (55 km/h)
- Lowest pressure: 1008 mbar (hPa); 29.77 inHg

Overall effects
- Fatalities: 2 total
- Damage: >$1 million (2010 USD)
- Areas affected: Gulf Coast of the United States
- IBTrACS
- Part of the 2010 Atlantic hurricane season

Tropical Depression Five was an Atlantic tropical cyclone that lasted for 12 hours, although its remnants persisted for almost another week. Its precursor was from a non-tropical trough east of Florida, and on August 10 it developed in the southeastern Gulf of Mexico. It was the fifth depression of the 2010 Atlantic hurricane season. The system was declassified as a tropical cyclone the following day, a remnant circulation later moved over Louisiana and Mississippi, producing heavy rainfall and causing flooding. Along the Florida coast, the system produced heavy waves that contributed to two deaths. Moving inland, the remnants of the depression reached central Alabama before turning southward. The system nearly redeveloped into a tropical cyclone on August 16 after it again reached the Gulf of Mexico, but it became disorganized and turned northward into Mississippi. The depression twice caused BP to delay work in building a relief well to combat the Deepwater Horizon oil spill.

== Meteorological history ==
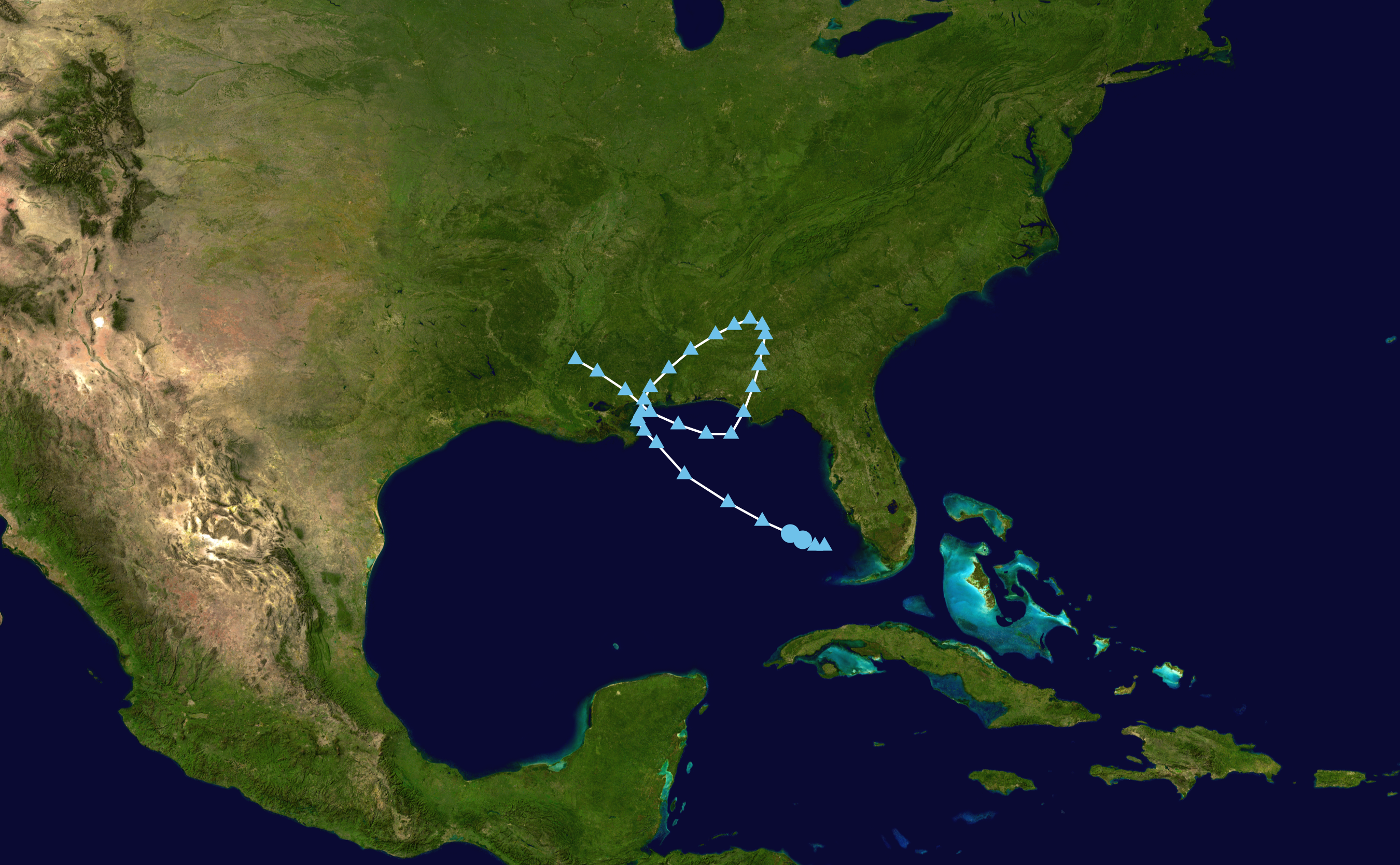
Map plotting the storm's track and intensity, according to the Saffir–Simpson scale Map key Saffir–Simpson scale Tropical depression (≤38 mph, ≤62 km/h) Tropical storm (39–73 mph, 63–118 km/h) Category 1 (74–95 mph, 119–153 km/h) Category 2 (96–110 mph, 154–177 km/h) Category 3 (111–129 mph, 178–208 km/h) Category 4 (130–156 mph, 209–251 km/h) Category 5 (≥157 mph, ≥252 km/h) Unknown Storm type Tropical cyclone Subtropical cyclone Extratropical cyclone, remnant low, tropical disturbance, or monsoon depression

The origins of the depression were from a dissipating cold front that extended from the northeast Gulf of Mexico across Florida on August 7, connected to a weak non-tropical low-pressure area located several hundred miles east-southeast of Jacksonville, Florida. The system had disorganized convection– thunderstorms– and moved generally southwestward after drifting against the Gulf Stream. Conditions were initially unfavorable for development, due to strong upper-level wind shear and land interaction. By late August 9, the low reached the southeastern Gulf of Mexico, and the National Hurricane Center (NHC) noted a medium chance for tropical or subtropical development, due to an anticipated decrease in wind shear. The convection gradually increased and became better organized, and a hurricane hunters flight late on August 10 confirmed the development of Tropical Depression Five about 120 miles (190 km) west of Fort Myers, Florida.

Upon being classified as a tropical cyclone, the tropical depression had a broad circulation and organized deep convection. It was located over very warm water temperatures, although the upper-level environment was not conducive for significant intensification. Easterly wind shear was forecast, but the NHC anticipated the depression strengthening to 45 mph (70 km/h) before making landfall in Louisiana. Under the influence of a mid-level ridge to its north, the depression was forecast to track generally northwestward. Early on August 11, the convection diminished significantly due to the entrainment of dry air and vertical wind shear from a nearby upper-level low. The circulation became difficult to locate; however, conditions favored the redevelopment of the thunderstorm activity. One tropical cyclone prediction model forecast significant intensification to a minimum pressure of 968 mbar, and other models forecast the depression would reach hurricane status upon making landfall. As it continued to the northwest, the circulation remained broad and disorganized, and convection remained minimal. Late on August 11, a hurricane hunters flight reported that the depression was no longer a tropical cyclone, and in post-analysis, the NHC determined that the depression was only a tropical cyclone for 12 hours. Redevelopment was not anticipated.

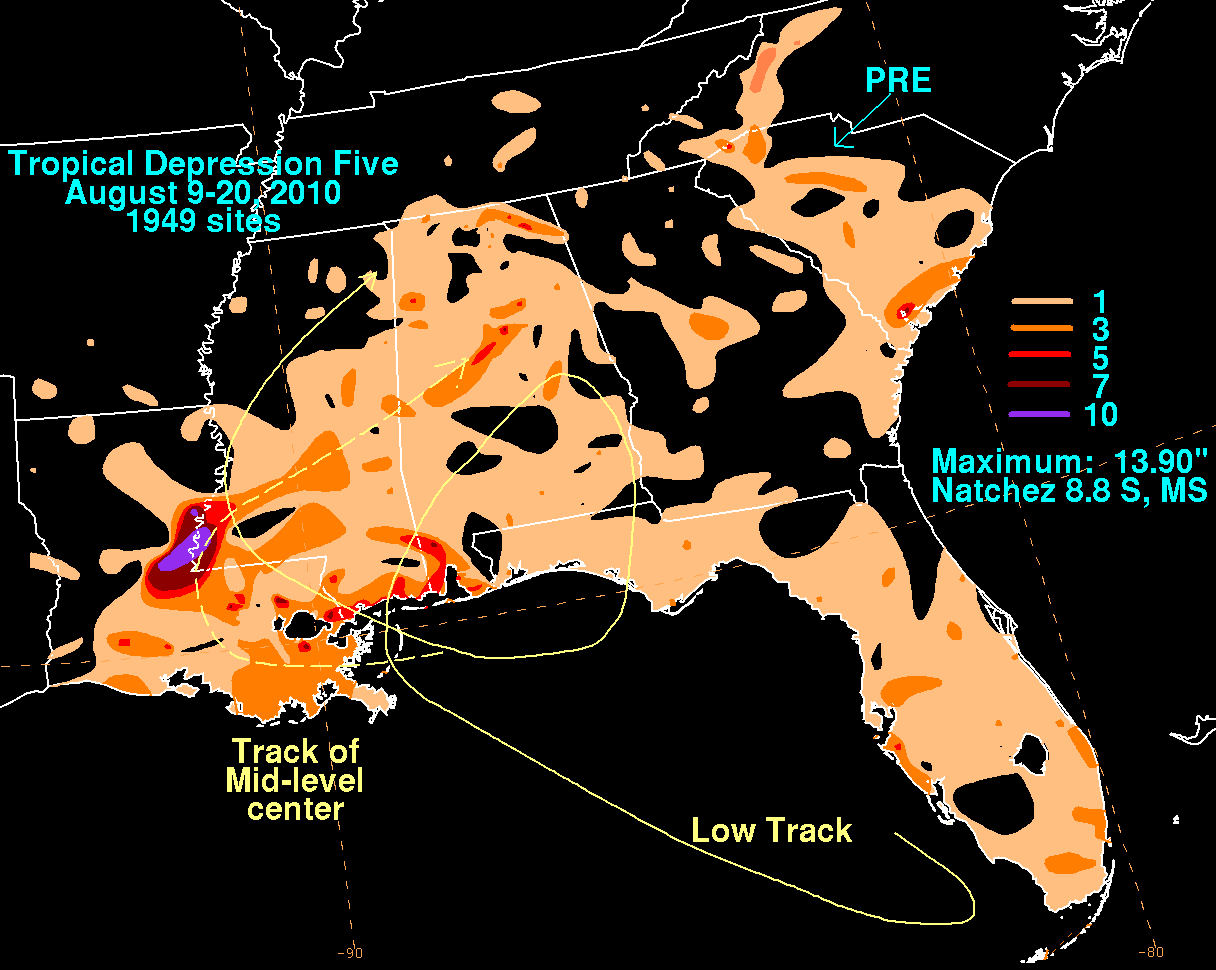
Rainfall from the depression throughout the Southern United States

The remnants of Tropical Depression Five moved ashore on Louisiana on August 12, by which time the circulation had become better defined. A small circular area of convection was observed on radar approaching New Orleans, supported by diffluence from an anticyclone over Georgia. The system moved slowly, turning northeastward and tracking inland along southern Mississippi on August 13. By late on August 14, the remnants reached central Alabama and began to move southward due to a ridge to its north. The next day it reached the Florida Panhandle, and before the low reached open waters, the NHC assessed a 50% chance for redevelopment due to favorable conditions. Early on August 16, the low reached the Gulf of Mexico, and a hurricane hunters flight reported a weak circulation and convection that was disorganized and disassociated. Upper-level conditions remained only marginally favorable, although the NHC noted that "only a small increase in organization would result in the formation of a tropical depression." Early on August 18, the remnants of the system dissipated over Southwestern Mississippi.

== Preparations and impact ==
The remnants of Tropical Depression Five regaining strength over the northeastern Gulf of Mexico.

Prior to becoming a tropical cyclone, the system dropped locally heavy rainfall in portions of southern Florida. Palm Beach International Airport recorded 2.25 inches (5.7 cm) on August 8, a record for the date. The system spawned a weak tornado near Boca Raton, which downed a few trees and damaged shingles from one house. In Sarasota, high tides from the system affected 200 sea turtle nests, of which 20 had to be transported to a safer location. Once in the Gulf of Mexico, the developing system threatened the area affected by the Deepwater Horizon oil spill; this prompted BP to stop operations temporarily in constructing a relief well. The same event occurred a week later when the depression was threatening to redevelop.

Upon issuing the first advisory on Tropical Depression Five, the NHC issued a tropical storm warning from Destin, Florida to Intracoastal City, Louisiana, including Lake Pontchartrain and New Orleans. Louisiana governor Bobby Jindal issued a state of emergency due to the threat from the depression. The remnants of the depression produced rough surf and riptides along the coast. In Panama City Beach, Florida, one man was hospitalized, and on Anna Maria Island, two elderly people died after being swept away by rip currents; the deaths were believed to have been fatigue-induced heart attacks, and not drowning. In the final advisory on the depression, the NHC noted the potential for the system to produce heavy rainfall across the southern United States. Accordingly, local National Weather Service offices issued flood watches for 12 Louisiana parishes and 8 Mississippi counties. While the depression moved through the region, it dropped heavy rainfall of up to 8 in (20 cm) around the New Orleans area, flooding streets as well as entering one apartment complex. Rainfall from the system extended as far inland as Atlanta, where thunderstorms damaged three houses.

As the remnants moved southward toward the Gulf of Mexico, its associated thunderstorms struck Mobile, Alabama and produced heavy rainfall, estimated up to 4 in (10 cm). The rainfall flooded several streets and damaged the city's water line, and 1,921 customers were left without power. When the remnants affected Mississippi a second time, the system dropped heavy rainfall that resulted in flash flooding near Sibley. The system caused about $1 million in damage after floodwaters washed out a bridge and entered several buildings. As the system approached Louisiana for a second time, local National Weather Offices issued a coastal flood watch and a flash flood watch. Sixteen hours of intense rainfall occurred in Avoyelles Parish, flooding at least 40 buildings. Lightning killed three cows and destroyed a house, and damage was estimated around $750,000. Further inland, the remnants interacted with a stationary cold front over central Tennessee, causing $22 million in damage after heavy rainfall affected bridges, roads, and properties.

== See also ==
- List of Florida hurricanes (2000–present)
- Tropical Storm Bonnie (2010) – Took a similar track earlier in the season
