= List of Florida hurricanes (2000–present) =

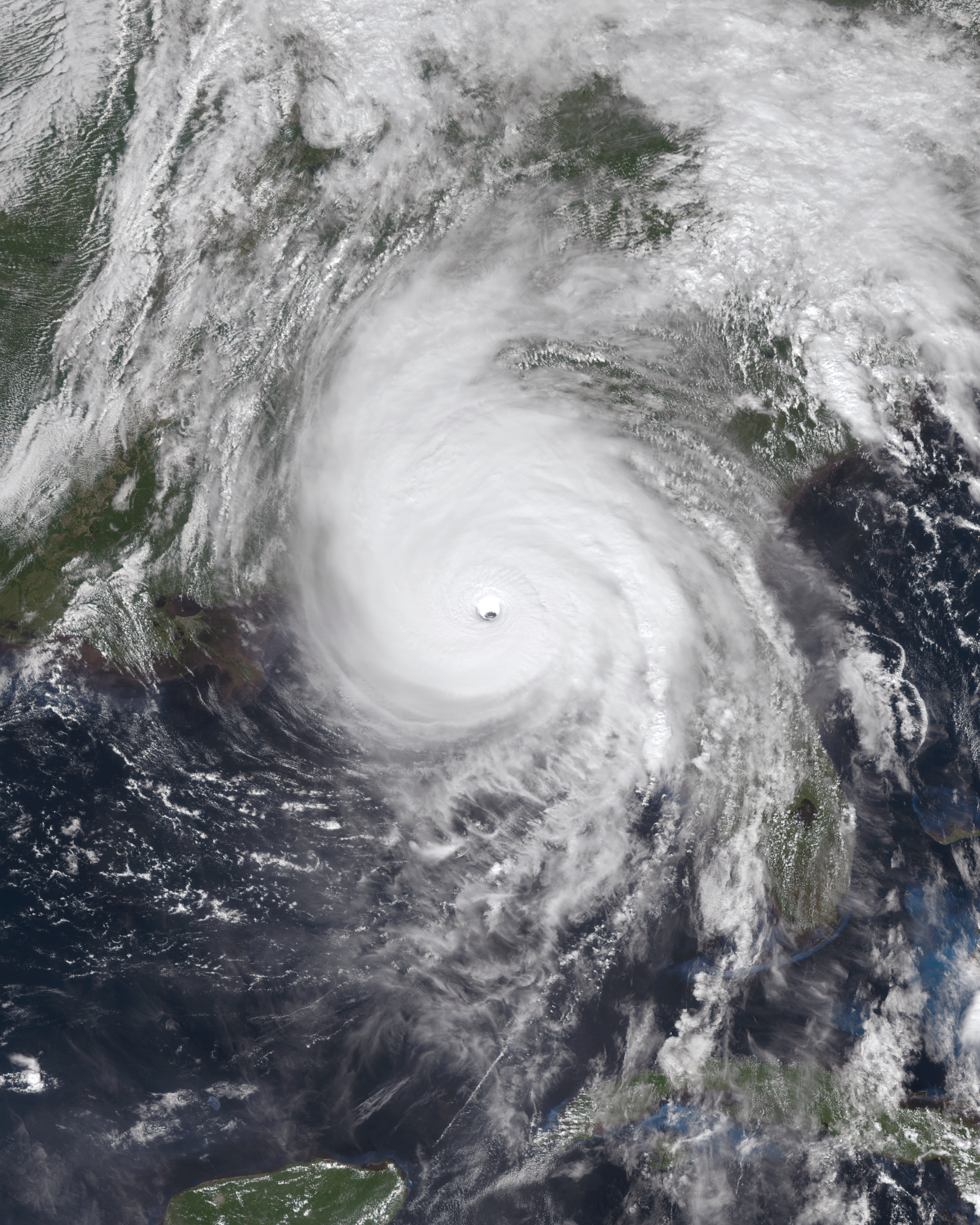
Hurricane Michael making landfall near Mexico Beach, Florida as a Category 5 hurricane on October 10, 2018

In the 21st century, 80 tropical and subtropical cyclones, their remnants, and their precursors have affected the U.S. state of Florida. Collectively, cyclones in Florida during the time period resulted in more than $236 billion in damage and 615 deaths. Every year included at least one tropical cyclone affecting the state. During the 2004 season, more than one out of every five houses in the state received damage. After Wilma in 2005, it would be 11 years until another hurricane would strike the state, Hermine in 2016. In 2017, Irma became the first major hurricane to strike the state in 12 years. Florida experienced at least one tropical cyclone landfall annually between 2017 and 2024. In 2025, there were no landfalls in the state.

The strongest hurricane to hit the state during the time period was Hurricane Michael, which was a Category 5 on the Saffir–Simpson scale, the highest category on the scale. Michael was the strongest hurricane to strike the contiguous United States since Hurricane Andrew in 1992. Additionally, hurricanes Charley, Jeanne, Dennis, Wilma, Irma, Ian, Idalia, Helene, and Milton made landfall on the state as major hurricanes.

== 2000–2009 ==
=== 2000 ===
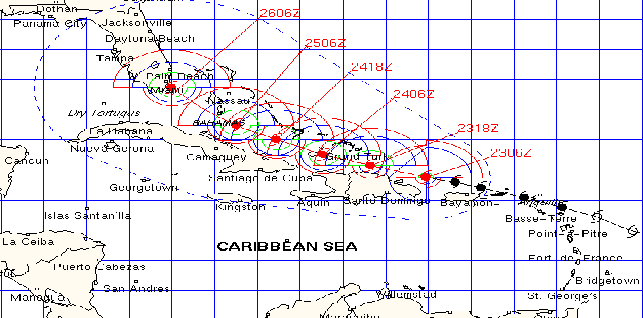
A forecast map of Hurricane Debby projecting its landfall in Florida

- August 22 – Hurricane Debby was forecasted to move through the Florida Keys as a hurricane, which prompted a mandatory evacuation for all non-residents. However, Debby dissipated before its remnant tropical wave produced heavy rainfall and strong winds across South Florida.
- September 18 – Tropical Storm Gordon made landfall on Cedar Key, dropping up to 9.48 inches (241 mm) of rainfall in Mayo. Hundreds of homes were damaged by floodwaters or fallen trees, and damage in the state amounted to at least $5.1 million (2000 USD). A surfer drowned in rough seas near Pensacola.
- September 22 – Tropical Storm Helene hit near Pensacola, damaging hundreds of homes from floodwaters. Monetary damages totaled over $1 million (2000 USD).
- October 3 – The precursor disturbance to Tropical Storm Leslie produced 10–20 inches (250–510 mm) of rainfall across Southeastern Florida, flooding about 93,000 houses. The flooding caused $950 million in damages (2000 USD) and three indirect deaths.

=== 2001 ===
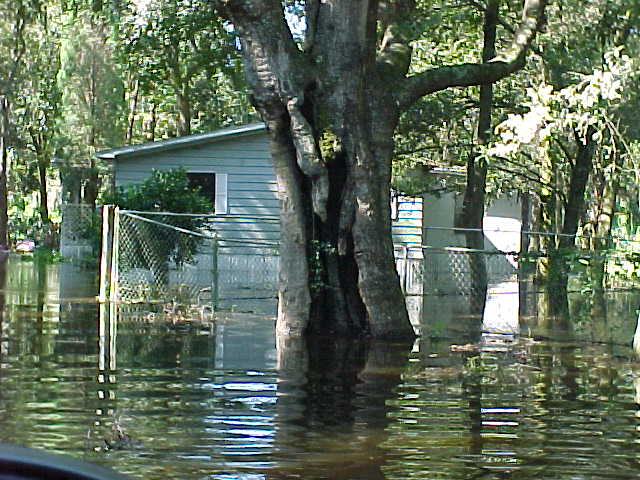
Flood damage from Tropical Storm Gabrielle

- June 12 – Tropical Storm Allison moved through Alabama and Georgia, with its outer rainbands producing up to 10.1 inches (260 mm) of rain at the Tallahassee Regional Airport. The rainfall destroyed 10 homes and damaged 599 others, with monetary damage totaling $20 million (2001 USD). Eight people died in the state, five of which due to rip currents.
- August 6 – After meandering for several days in the eastern Gulf of Mexico, Tropical Storm Barry made landfall at Santa Rosa Beach, producing heavy rainfall across much of Florida which peaked at 11.7 inches (300 mm) in Stuart. The storm killed two in the state and left $1.5 million in damage (2001 USD).
- September 14 – Tropical Storm Gabrielle hit Venice, dropping moderate to heavy rainfall including a peak total of 15.1 inches (380 mm) in Parrish. The combination of flooding from rainfall and gusty winds caused $230 million in damage (2001 USD) and one direct death, and high waves from the storm indirectly killed a person in the Florida Keys.
- November 5 – Hurricane Michelle passed to the south of the state, dropping up to 4.99 inches (127 mm) of rainfall and causing $10.07 million in damages (2001 USD). The hurricane spawned two tornadoes, resulting in $16,000 of damage (2001 USD).

=== 2002 ===
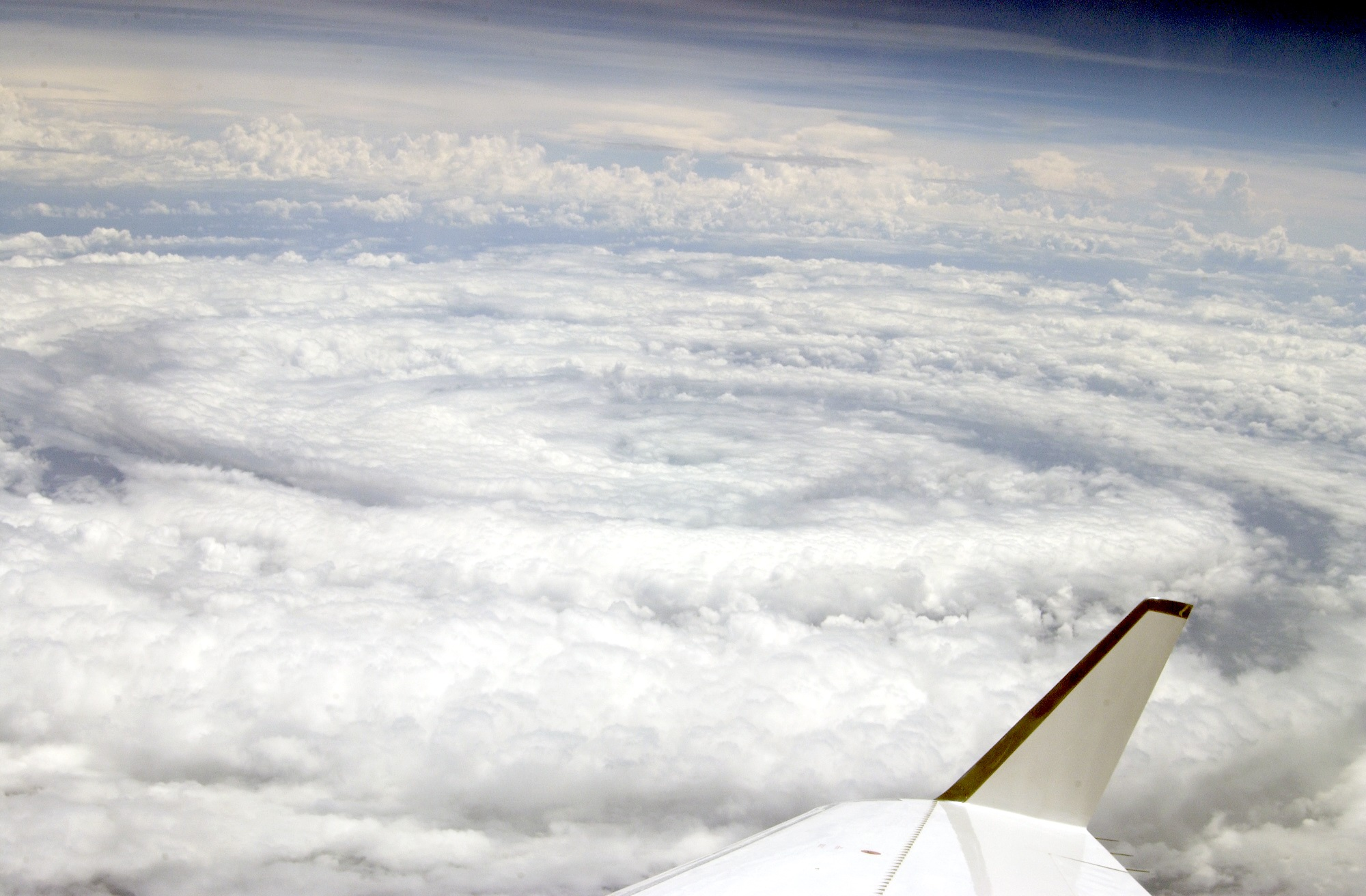
Tropical Storm Edouard seen by hurricane hunters

- July 13 – The precursor disturbance to Tropical Storm Arthur moved across the Florida Panhandle days before developing off the Carolinas. The system dropped heavy rainfall in Florida, reaching 4.79 in (122 mm) in Weston.
- August 4 – High surf from Tropical Storm Bertha killed one person at Perdido Key State Recreation Area.
- August 9 – Lifeguards rescued more than 25 swimmers in Volusia County due to high surf from Tropical Storm Cristobal.
- September 4 – Tropical Storm Edouard made landfall near Ormond Beach as a weakening tropical storm. While crossing the peninsula from east to west, the storm dropped heavy rainfall, reaching 7.64 in (194 mm) in DeSoto City; this caused some flooding.
- September 14 – While moving ashore the northern gulf coast, Tropical Storm Hanna produced rip currents that killed three people along the Florida panhandle. It also dropped heavy rainfall in the state, reaching 9.67 in (246 mm) near Chipley.
- September 26 – While Tropical Storm Isidore hit southern Louisiana, its large circulation dropped heavy rainfall across Florida, reaching 11.31 in (287 mm) in Milton. Rip currents killed a man in Manatee County. Tornadoes spawned by the storm damage multiple mobile homes, with monetary damage across the state totaling over $11 million (2002 USD).
- October 3 – Hurricane Lili made landfall in southern Louisiana, and dropped 1.04 inches (26 mm) of rainfall in Pensacola.
- October 11 – Tropical Storm Kyle turned northward to the east of the state, producing up to 2.05 inches (52 mm) of precipitation in Fernandina Beach and a light storm surge.

=== 2003 ===
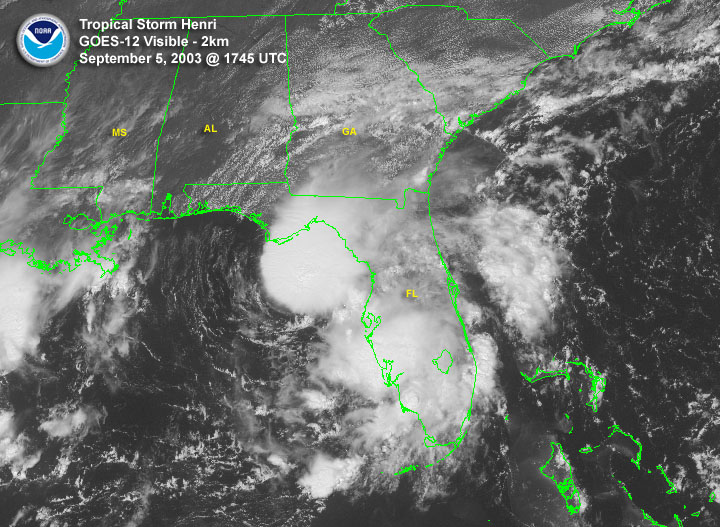
Tropical Storm Henri shortly before landfall

- April 20 – Swells from Tropical Storm Ana capsized a boat near Jupiter, killing two of the four passengers aboard.
- June 30 – While Tropical Storm Bill moved ashore southern Louisiana, its outer rainbands dropped 9.30 in (236 mm) in Milligan. Rip currents killed two people in Panama City Beach. Floodwaters damaged at least 40 houses, resulting in $1 million in damage.
- July 2003 – A man died in Navarre after suffering a heart attack while swimming in high surf caused by Hurricane Claudette.
- July 25 – Tropical Depression Seven formed to the east of the state and dropped light precipitation.
- August 14 – The precursor to Hurricane Erika moved westward across the state before developing in the eastern Gulf of Mexico.
- August 30 – While Tropical Storm Grace moved ashore Texas, its outer periphery dropped rainfall across much of Florida.
- September 6 – Tropical Depression Henri hit Clearwater, before crossing the state. Rainfall in the state reached 9.09 inches (231 mm) in Hialeah, which caused some flooding Lightning caused by the storm injured a man in Lee County.
- September 13 – Rip currents from Hurricane Isabel killed a surfer in Nassau County.

=== 2004 ===
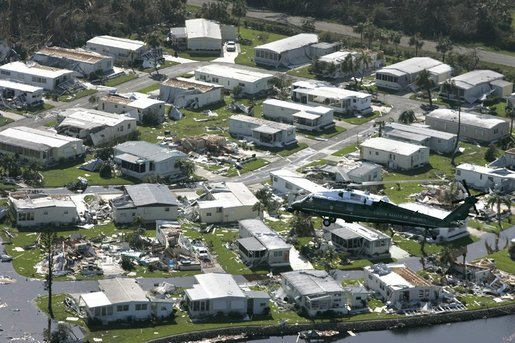
President George W. Bush, aboard Marine One, surveys hurricane damage from Hurricane Charley at a mobile home park in Fort Myers

- August 12 – Tropical Storm Bonnie moved ashore the panhandle near Saint Vincent Island as a weakening storm. Rains in the state reached 4.64 in (118 mm) in Milligan.
- August 13 – Hurricane Charley struck southwestern Florida as a Category 4 hurricane, the strongest landfall in the continental United States since Hurricane Andrew in 1992. Its eye crossed Cayo Costa and later the mainland at Punta Gorda, before crossing the state with much of its intensity retained. A wind gust of 173 mph (278 km/h) was recorded on a tower in Punta Gorda. Orlando recorded a wind gust of 105 mph (170 km/h). The winds damaged or destroyed thousands of homes, knocked down tens of thousands of trees, and left more than 2 million Floridians without power. Charley also spawned nine tornadoes across the state. Rainfall associated with the hurricane reached 9.88 in (251 mm) in Bud Slough. Charley resulted in 34 deaths across the state, as well as 792 injuries, and damage was estimated at $16 billion, at the time the second-costliest American hurricane.
- September 5 – Hurricane Frances made landfall along the southern end of Hutchinson Island as a Category 2 hurricane, and moved slowly across the state, making a second landfall along the gulf coast near New Port Richey. Wind gusts reached 108 mph (174 km/h) at Fort Pierce. Frances dropped heavy rainfall in the state, peaking at 16.61 in (422 mm) at Kent Grove. The storm produced an estimated 6 to 8 ft (1.8 to 2.4 m) storm surge along Florida's east coast, which damaged marinas, piers, and other coastal property. The storm also produced 23 tornadoes in the state as part of a widespread outbreak. At least 1.7 million people lost power during the storm, and more than 17,000 buildings were damaged in Palm Beach County alone. During its passage, Frances led to 37 deaths, as well as $9.8 billion in damage.
- September 16 – Hurricane Ivan struck Gulf Shores, Alabama as a major hurricane, with its large and powerful circulation producing peak wind gusts of 107 mph (172 km/h) in Pensacola. Ivan moved ashore with a significant storm surge, estimated at 10 to 15 ft (3.0 to 4.6 m); the surge, in addition to high waves, severely damaged the Escambia Bay Bridge carrying Interstate 10. Rainfall from the storm reached 15.75 in (400 mm) in Pensacola. The hurricane also produced an extensive tornado outbreak, including 18 that touched down in Florida. The strong winds knocked down many trees along the panhandle, causing prolonged power outages. The remnants of Ivan later crossed over the southern portion of the state after looping southward, eventually reforming in the Gulf of Mexico on September 23. Damage in the state totaled over $4 billion, and 29 people died from the hurricane.
- September 25 – Hurricane Jeanne made landfall in southeastern Florida less than two miles from where Frances had made landfall three weeks prior as a Category 3 hurricane. Wind gusts reached 128 mph (206 km/h) in Fort Pierce, and 116 mph (187 km/h) in Vero Beach. A significant storm surge of 6 ft (1.8 m) inundated parts of the Treasure Coast, which was the hardest hit area. Over $2 billion (2004 USD) in damage occurred in Indian River County, and over $1 billion (2004 USD) in damage occurred in St. Lucie and Martin counties occurred. Heavy rainfall from Jeanne occurred, peaking at 11.97 inches (304 mm) at Kenansville. Statewide damage was estimated at $7.5 billion, and there were six deaths.
- October 10 – When Tropical Storm Matthew moved ashore southern Louisiana, its outer rainbands extended into the Florida panhandle, with 3.29 in (84 mm) of rainfall recorded in Pensacola.

=== 2005 ===
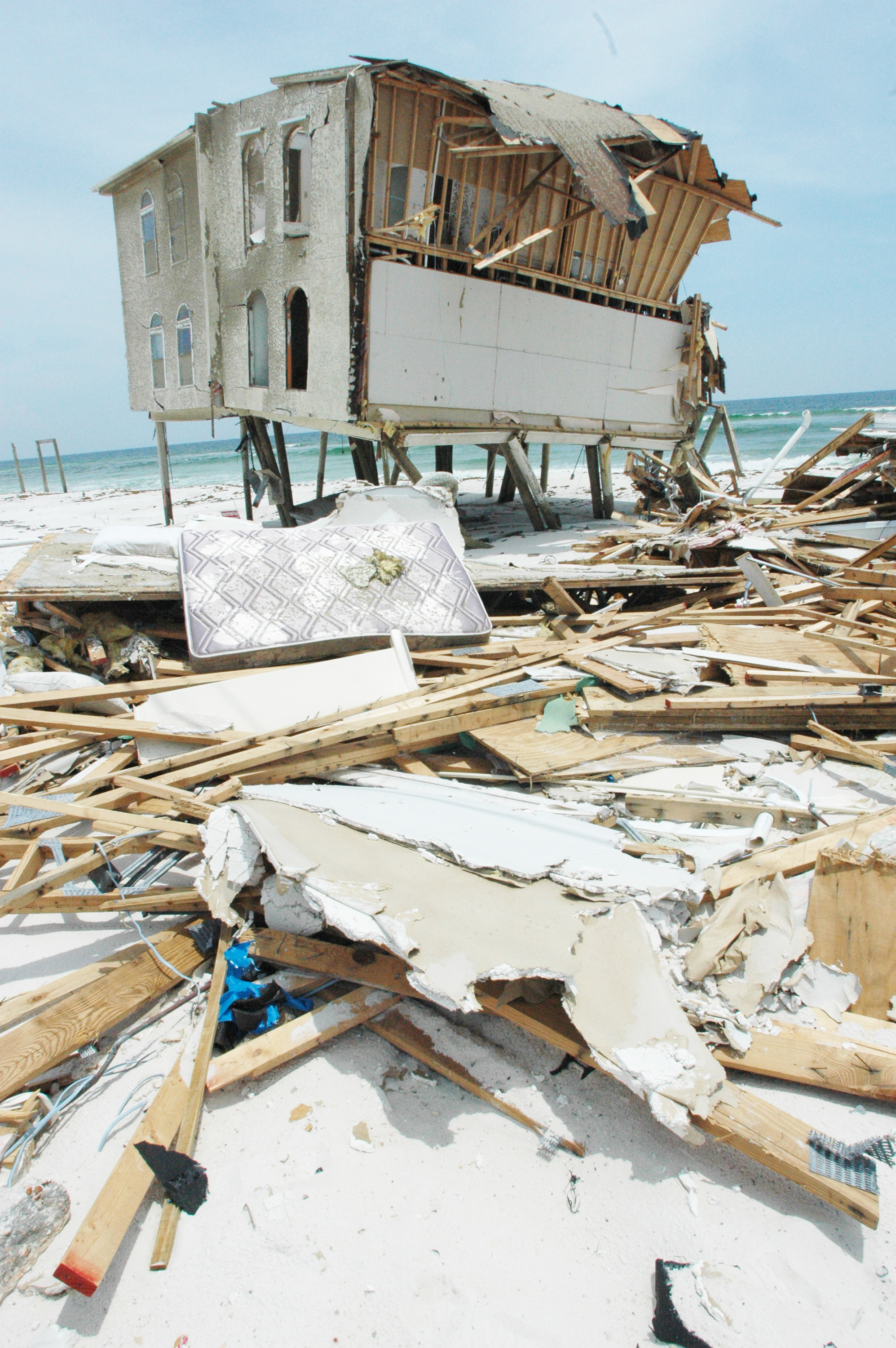
A beachfront home in Navarre Beach, Florida largely destroyed by Hurricane Dennis

- June 11 – Tropical Storm Arlene struck the panhandle just west of Pensacola, producing wind gusts of 60 mph (95 km/h). Rainfall reached 6.07 in (154 mm) in Naples. Rip currents from the storm killed a swimmer in Miami Beach. Damage was estimated at $3.5 million.
- July 6 – While Hurricane Cindy moved ashore the northern gulf coast, its large circulation dropped light rainfall and knocked down trees in the panhandle.
- July 10 – Hurricane Dennis made landfall just west of Navarre Beach as a major hurricane. A station in Navarre recorded wind gusts of 121 mph (195 km/h), while tropical storm force winds occurred in the southern and western portion of the state. Dennis produced nine tornadoes in the state, along with heavy rainfall that reached 8.7 in (220 mm) at a station near Bristol. High storm tides caused major beach erosion and coastal damage along the panhandle. Statewide damage was estimated at $1.5 billion, and there were 14 deaths in the state related to Dennis.
- August 25 – Hurricane Katrina moved ashore southeastern Florida as a minimal hurricane, producing a peak wind gust of 97 mph (156 km/h) at Homestead General Aviation Airport. Heavy rainfall accompanied the hurricane, peaking at 16.43 in (417 mm) in Perrine, which caused flooding in the Miami metro area. About 1.4 million people lost power during the storm. Later, when Katrina made its devastating landfall along the northern gulf coast, its large circulation produced high tides, light rainfall, and gusty winds along the western Florida panhandle. The hurricane killed 14 people across the state, and damage was estimated at $623 million.
- September 12 – Hurricane Ophelia formed and drifted along the east coast of Florida, producing wind gusts of 60 mph (95 km/h) at Cape Canaveral. The storm also produced high surf along the coast, which killed a swimmer in Palm Beach County. Rains in the state reached 5.04 in (128 mm) in Hastings.
- September 20 – Hurricane Rita passed south of the Florida Keys before entering the Gulf of Mexico. The outer rainbands produced 58 mph (93 km/h), along with 5.04 in (128 mm) of rainfall, which caused minor flooding and power outages.
- October 5 – Tropical Storm Tammy moved ashore near Atlantic Beach, with peak wind gusts of 60 mph (97 km/h). Rainfall reached 4.883 in (124.0 mm) at Naval Station Mayport.
- October 24 – Hurricane Wilma made landfall near Cape Romano as a major hurricane, with sustained hurricane-force winds recorded across the Miami area. Wind gusts reached 135 mph (215 km/h) on Marco Island. The strong winds left widespread wind damage, with fallen trees and power lines, damaged roofs, and lost crops. About 98% of South Florida lost power during the storm. A significant storm surge – estimated around 9 ft (2.7 m) near Marathon – inundated the Florida Keys. Rainfall during the storm reached 13.26 in (337 mm) at Kennedy Space Center. Wilma also spawned 10 tornadoes across the state. There were 30 deaths in the state related to Wilma, and statewide damage was estimated at $19 billion, making Wilma among the costliest United States hurricanes.

=== 2006 ===
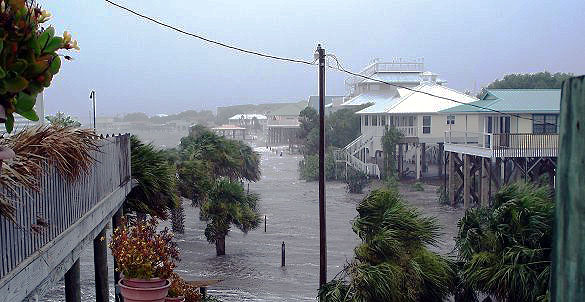
Storm surge flooding from Tropical Storm Alberto at Horseshoe Beach, Florida

- June 13 – Tropical Storm Alberto hit the Big Bend region. While crossing the state, it produced a storm surge that flooded dozens of buildings, as well as heavy rainfall that reached 7.08 inches (180 mm) near Tarpon Springs.
- August 30 – Tropical Storm Ernesto struck Plantation Key and subsequently moved across the southeastern portion of the state. The storm spawned two tornadoes in the state. Rainfall in the state reached 8.72 inches (221 mm) in South Golden Gate, which flooded houses. There were two traffic fatalities in the Miami metro area related to the storm.

=== 2007 ===
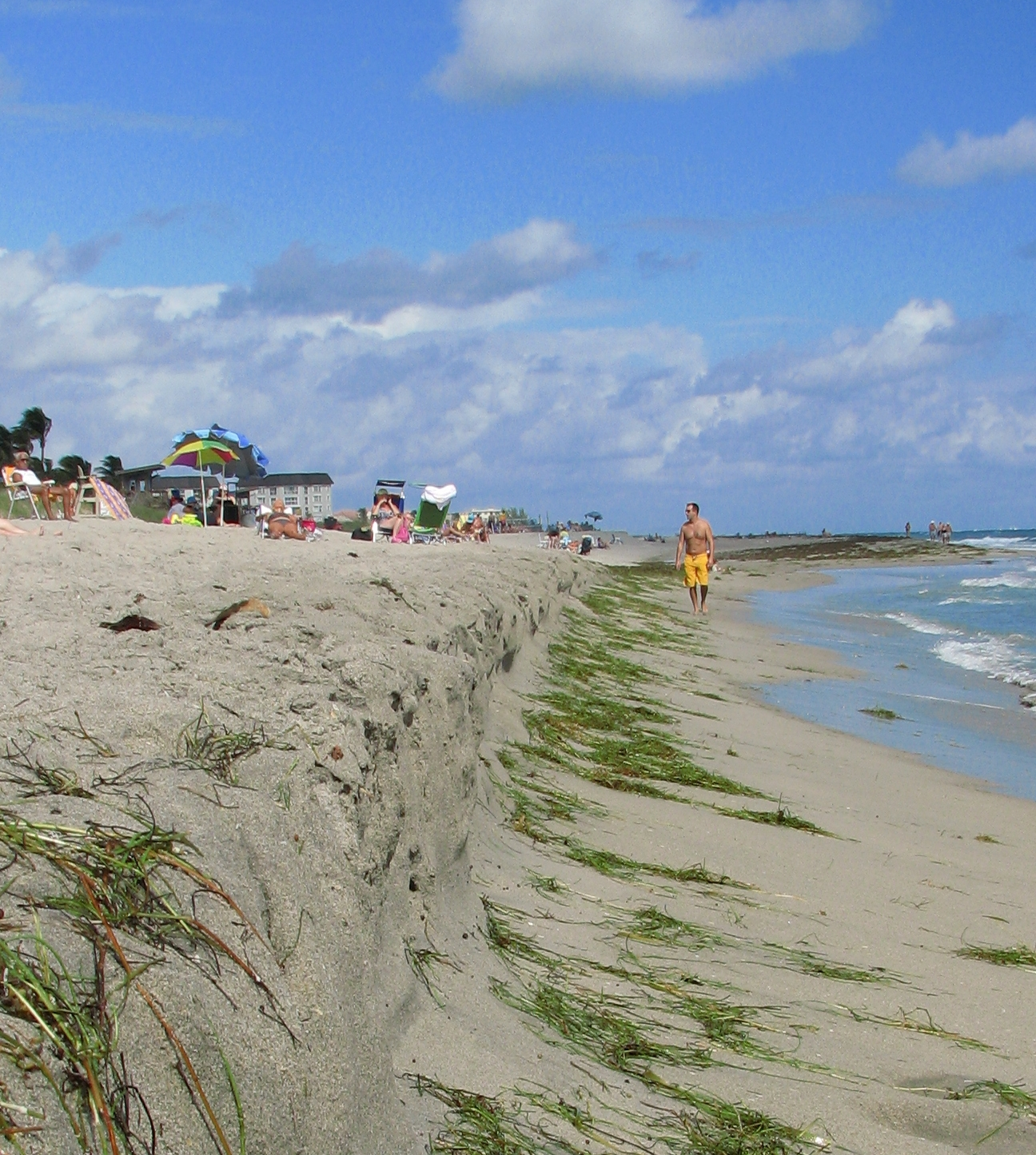
Beach erosion from Hurricane Noel

- May 9 – Subtropical Storm Andrea passed offshore northeastern Florida. Its large waves killed a surfer in New Smyrna Beach, while also causing beach erosion and coastal flooding.
- June 2 – Tropical Depression Barry made landfall near Tampa, bringing beneficial rainfall, as well as two tornadoes, to the state. Slick roads led to two traffic fatalities.
- August 23 – Rip currents from Hurricane Dean killed one person at Siesta Key.
- September 8 – Rough surf from Tropical Storm Gabrielle drowned one surfer and forced the rescue of 200 swimmers.
- September 13 – Hurricane Humberto moved ashore southeastern Texas, and its outskirts dropped light rainfall on the western Florida Panhandle.
- September 22 – Tropical Depression Ten moved ashore near Fort Walton Beach. Its precursor produced two tornadoes over southern Florida, along with heavy rainfall reaching 7.29 in (185 mm) at Hastings.
- October 31 – The interaction between Hurricane Noel and a ridge produced 54 mph (87 km/h) wind gusts, as well as large waves that caused beach erosion, costing at least $3 million.
- December 16 – The remnant circulation of Tropical Storm Olga struck the state near Tampa, producing hurricane-force wind gusts and a tornado that caused about $1 million in damage.

=== 2008 ===
- July 16 – The precursor to Tropical Storm Cristobal dropped 6 inches (150 mm) of precipitation was reported, causing some street flooding.
- July 22 – Rough surf from Hurricane Dolly killed one person along the panhandle.
- August 3 – Rip currents from Tropical Storm Edouard killed three people along the panhandle.
- August 18 – Tropical Storm Fay made the first of a record four landfalls in Florida, moving from the Florida Keys, crossing the southern portion of the state, and later turning to the west where it crossed the peninsula and later struck the panhandle. Fay dropped heavy rainfall across the state, peaking at 27.65 in (702 mm) near Melbourne; the rains caused widespread flooding that affected more than 15,000 homes. A tornado outbreak resulted in 19 tornadoes touching down in the state with the strongest one being rated EF2. Damage in the state reached at least $195 million. The storm led to 15 deaths in the state.
- August 31 – Hurricane Gustav brushed the Florida Keys before tracking into central Louisiana. Rip currents from the hurricane killed four people in Florida. The storm also produced six tornadoes in the state.
- September 5 – Hurricane Hanna passed east of the state while moving toward the Carolinas. Rip currents and high seas killed three people in the state.
- September 8 – As Hurricane Ike moved through Cuba, its outer bands dropped heavy rainfall in South Florida, and spawned two tornadoes in the Upper Florida Keys.
- November 14 – The remnants of Hurricane Paloma brought heavy rainfall to the Florida panhandle.

=== 2009 ===
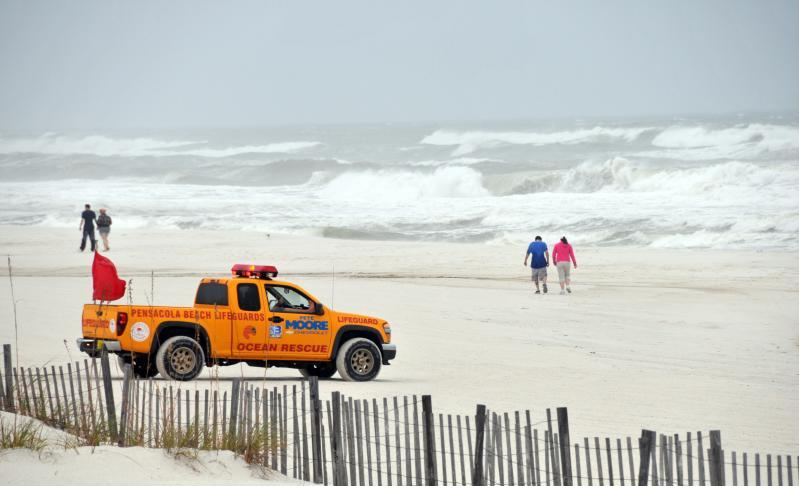
Conditions at Pensacola Beach, Florida on November 9, 2009, during the passage of Ida

- August 16–18 – Tropical Storm Claudette hit Santa Rosa Island on the panhandle, killing two people due to drowning. The storm also produced rainfall, gusty winds, and slightly above normal tides. An EF0 tornado in Cape Coral damaged 11 homes, leaving $103,000 in damage.
- August 21–22 – Hurricane Bill produced waves between 5 and 6 ft (1.5 and 1.8 m) along the east coast of Florida, resulting in one fatality at New Smyrna Beach.
- August 28 – Wave heights reached 7 ft (2.1 m) from Tropical Storm Danny off eastern Florida.
- November 10 – Former Hurricane Ida struck southern Alabama and later moved into the Florida panhandle as an extratropical cyclone. Ida produced wind gusts of 45 mph (70 km/h), along with high tides and rainfall. The storm caused scattered power outages and downed trees.

== 2010–2019 ==
=== 2010 ===
- June 30 – As Tropical Storm Alex moved across the Gulf of Mexico, its high tides washed tarballs from the Deepwater Horizon oil spill onto the Florida panhandle.
- July 23 – Tropical Storm Bonnie made landfall near Cutler Bay, Florida as a minimal tropical storm, bringing light rainfall and winds to southern parts of the state.
- August 10 – Tropical Depression Five developed off the southwest coast, producing high surf that led to two deaths along Anna Maria Island.
- August 28 – High surf from distant Hurricane Danielle killed a man in Satellite Beach, while dozens of other people had to be rescued by lifeguards.
- August 31 – September 4 – Hurricane Earl paralleled the East Coast of the United States, resulting in rip currents and wave heights up to 10 ft (3.0 m) along the eastern coastline of Florida. Three people were killed in the state: a 61-year-old charter boat captain who suffered grave injuries after falling off his boat approaching Jupiter Inlet, a 16-year-old who was rescued by a bystander but later died at the hospital, and a 57-year-old Swedish sailor whose boat was found but body was never recovered.
- September 19 – Distant Hurricane Igor produced high surf along the east coast of Florida.
- September 29 – The extratropical remnants of Tropical Storm Nicole passed southeast of the state, although it dropped heavy rainfall in South Florida, reaching 12.71 inches (323 mm) of rainfall in North Key Largo. Street flooding occurred in the upper Florida Keys and Miami Beach.
- October 16 – Hurricane Paula dissipated over Cuba, although its outer rainbands produced two waterspouts in the Florida Keys.

=== 2011 ===
- July 18–20 – Tropical Storm Bret generated wave heights of 3–5 ft (0.91–1.52 m) along the eastern coastline of Florida, injuring several beach-goers and prompting the rescue of dozens of others.
- August 25–26 – Hurricane Irene passed east of the state as a major hurricane, generating waves of 7–10 ft (2.1–3.0 m) around Jacksonville Beach and Atlantic Beach. The high waves killed two people along the coast from drowning. Wind gusts reached 53 mph (85 km/h) in the state, strong enough to knock down trees and cause minor power outages.
- September 4 – Tropical Storm Lee moved ashore the northern gulf coast, producing 7 inches (180 mm) of rainfall across the extreme western Panhandle. Moderate beach erosion and prolonged rip currents affected the region. There were four tornadoes in the state related to the storm.
- September 5 – Swells from distant Hurricane Katia killed a swimmer in Ormond Beach.
- October 28–31 – Moisture from Hurricane Rina combined with a stalled front, leading to heavy rainfall across South Florida, reaching 15.79 inches (401 mm) in Boca West. Many cities recorded their top-10-wettest October on record. Over 160 homes and buildings suffered water inundation, and numerous streets were closed, particularly in Broward County.
- November 9–10 – Long-distance swells generated by Tropical Storm Sean produced numerous strong rip currents along the eastern coastline, drowning a 34-year-old female and injuring two others.

=== 2012 ===
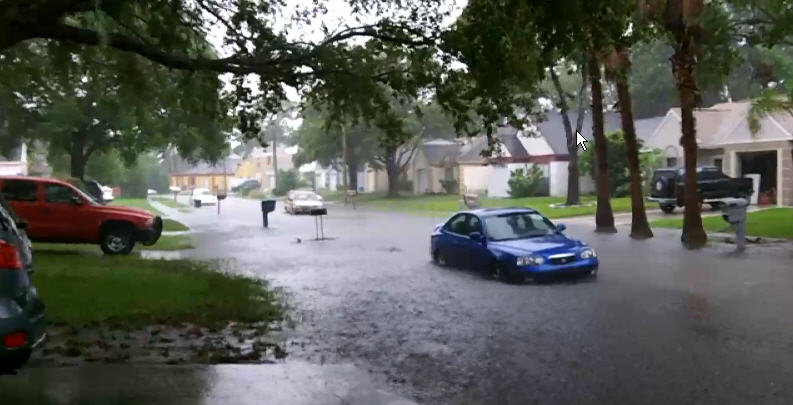
A street flooding in Largo during Tropical Storm Debby

- May 28–30 – Tropical Storm Beryl made landfall near Jacksonville Beach, becoming the strongest off-season storm to strike the United States. Wind gusts in Florida reached 73 mph (117 km/h) on Buck Island. The storm also dropped heavy rainfall, reaching 15.0 in (380 mm) in Wellborn. Trees and power lines were damaged, while a few tornadoes result in modest damage. A teenager died in high seas in Daytona Beach.
- June 23–27 – Tropical Storm Debby moved ashore western Florida near Steinhatchee as a weak yet sprawling storm, producing catastrophic flooding across northern and central Florida. Rainfall accumulations peaked at 28.78 inches (731 mm) near Curtis Mill, resulting in hundreds of damaged homes and record river flooding. Debby also spawned 24 tornadoes, most of them weak. The storm killed seven people throughout the state, and left at least $105 million in damage.
- August 25–29 – Tropical Storm Isaac passed just southwest of Key West, although its effects in the Florida Keys were minimal. Across southern Florida, Isaac dropped heavy rainfall in southern Florida, reaching 15.86 inches (403 mm) in Loxahatchee. The storm also spawned five tornadoes. The storm led to two deaths in the state from traffic accidents. Damage in the state totaled over $48 million. The threat of Isaac caused the first day of the 2012 Republican National Convention in Tampa to be canceled.
- October 25–27 – Hurricane Sandy produced 20 ft (6.1 m) high waves in Palm Beach County while the storm passed east of the state, causing flooding, beach erosion, and $14 million worth of damage. Winds from the storm reached 67 mph (108 km/h) in the state, strong enough to leave about 1,000 people without power.

=== 2013 ===
- June 6 – Tropical Storm Andrea made landfall in northwestern Florida near Steinhatchee and continued northeastward through the state. The storm produced a peak wind gust of 83 mph (134 km/h) at the Jacksonville Beach Pier, possibly related to a waterspout. Andrea produced 10 tornadoes in the state, as well as heavy rainfall reaching 14.27 inches (362 mm) in North Miami Beach, which caused flooding.
- August 3 – Lightning struck a man in Hialeah, related to Tropical Storm Dorian passing east of the state as a tropical depression.
- October 7 – The remnants of Tropical Storm Karen moved across the Florida panhandle, with a statewide peak rainfall of 6.95 in (177 mm) recorded in Panama City.

=== 2014 ===
- August 4 – Two people required rescue off the coast of Jacksonville due to rip currents from Hurricane Bertha.
- September 17 – Rip currents from distant Hurricane Edouard affected the east coast of Florida.

=== 2015 ===
- May 5 – Rainfall reached 3.17 in (81 mm) in Hollywood from Tropical Storm Ana developing east of the state.
- August 30–31 – The remnants of Tropical Storm Erika dropped heavy rainfall in southern Florida, reaching 9 in (230 mm) at a station northwest of Sweetwater. Minor flash flooding left streets in Wynwood impassable.
- October 1–2 – Hurricane Joaquin indirectly caused a period of high tides along Florida's east coast, due to its interaction with a developing low near the state drawing moisture from the hurricane. Tides reached 4.88 ft (1.49 m) in Fernandina Beach.
- October 26 The remnants of Hurricane Patricia brought heavy rains and high winds gusts to 70 mph in Florida Panhandle.

=== 2016 ===
Melbourne radar loop of Matthew on October 7, 2016, as the eye passed east of Central Florida

- May 29 – Rip currents from Tropical Storm Bonnie killed a swimmer in Melbourne Beach, while dozens of other people required rescue.
- June 6 – Tropical Storm Colin made landfall in the Big Bend of Florida at Apalachee Bay, and moved quickly northeastward through the state. Wind gusts in the state reached 66 mph (106 km/h) at Kennedy Space Center. Heavy rainfall, peaking at 17.54 in (446 mm) near Seminole, caused some flooding. Three people drowned along the Florida Panhandle due to rip currents.
- September 1 – Hurricane Hermine made landfall along the Big Bend of Florida with winds of 80 mph (130 km/h), making it the first hurricane landfall to the state since Hurricane Wilma in 2005. The highest recorded wind gust in the state was 78 mph (126 km/h) in Bald Point State Park. Hermine moved ashore with a 7.5 ft (2.3 m) storm surge, which occurred alongside heavy rainfall that peaked at 22.36 in (568 mm) near Tarpon Springs. Hermine damaged or destroyed more than 2,600 buildings and left more than 253,000 people without power. A man died in Ocala after being struck by a tree. Insured damage in the state reached US$80 million.
- September 14 – Tropical Storm Julia formed over eastern Florida, producing peak wind gusts of 59 mph (95 km/h) in Crescent Beach while moving northward through the state. The storm spawned a brief EF0 tornado near Barefoot Bay, which damaged a roof.
- October 7 – Hurricane Matthew paralleled the east coast of Florida as a major hurricane, with the center remaining about 35 mi (55 km) offshore. The western edge of the eyewall passed over Cape Canaveral, producing wind gusts of 107 mph (172 km/h) there. Matthew's strong winds knocked down trees and power lines, leaving 1.36 million people without power. The hurricane produced widespread beach erosion from its high waves and storm surge, with portions of SR A1A washed out, and millions of dollars' worth of equipment damaged at Kennedy Space Center. There were 14 deaths in the state related to the hurricane. Statewide damage totaled at least $1.3 billion.
- October 12 – Swells from Hurricane Nicole combined with the annual king tide to produce coastal flooding in South Florida.

=== 2017 ===
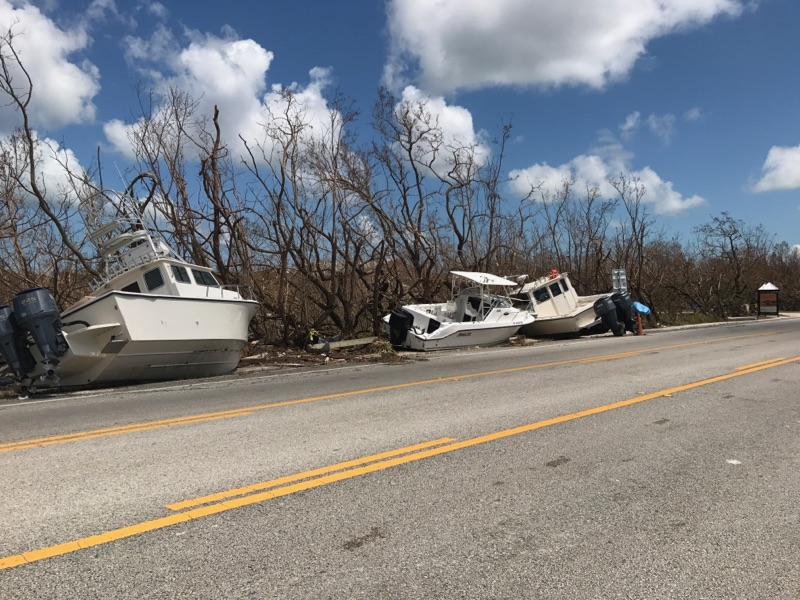
Boats washed ashore in the Florida Keys due to Hurricane Irma

- June 22 – While moving ashore Louisiana, Tropical Storm Cindy brought heavy rainfall to the Florida Panhandle, reaching 9.46 in (240 mm), which caused minor flooding. The storm spawned an EF0 tornado in southern Okaloosa County.
- July 31 – Tropical Storm Emily made landfall just south of Tampa Bay with winds of 60 mph (95 km/h). Heavy rainfall reached 7.19 in (183 mm) near Naples, causing flooding. The storm also produced an EF0 tornado in Manatee County. Statewide damage was estimated at $10 million.
- August 26 – September 1 – As Tropical Storm Harvey made its final landfall in Louisiana, its outer rainbands dropped rainfall to the Florida Panhandle, causing some flooding.
- September 10 – Hurricane Irma made landfall on Cudjoe Key as a Category 4 hurricane with sustained winds of 130 mph (210 km/h), followed hours later by a second landfall on Marco Island with winds of 115 mph (185 km/h). The hurricane caused or contributed to at least 87 deaths in the state, with possibly over 400 deaths related to the storm. Storm damage was heaviest in the Florida Keys, where Irma's storm surge damaged or destroyed more than 1,300 boats. Heavy damage occurred around the Miami metropolitan area. Strong winds, heavy rainfall, and tornadoes affected the rest of the state as Irma moved northward, with a statewide rainfall peak of 21.66 in (550 mm) recorded in Fort Pierce. Record flooding occurred in northeastern Florida, including in Jacksonville. Irma left an estimated $50 billion in damage.
- September 24 – Rip currents from Hurricane Maria affected the state's east coast, prompting at least 22 water rescues.
- October 7–8 – Hurricane Nate moved ashore Mississippi, while producing a 3 to 5 ft (0.91 to 1.52 m) storm surge in the western Florida panhandle, which damaged part of SR 399. Heavy rainfall, up to 10 in (250 mm), caused flash flooding.
- October 29 – Tropical Storm Philippe and an associated trough produced heavy rainfall across southern Florida, reaching 10.93 in (278 mm) at Boynton Beach. The weather system also produced three weak tornadoes.

=== 2018 ===
The eye of Hurricane Michael making landfall at Mexico Beach as a Category 5 on the Saffir–Simpson scale, the strongest landfall in the country since 1992

- May 29 – Tropical Storm Alberto made landfall near Laguna Beach with winds of 45 mph (70 km/h). The storm dropped heavy rainfall to the east over the Florida panhandle, reaching 11.8 in (300 mm) at Taylor Creek on the northern shore of Lake Okeechobee. Gusty winds knocked down trees, causing some power outages. In Port Salerno, Alberto spawned a brief EF0 tornado.
- September 3 – Tropical Storm Gordon moved over the Florida Keys and extreme southwestern Florida. The storm caused slick roads that led to a fatal car crash on I-95 near Miami. Gordon later moved ashore southern Mississippi; its outer rainbands knocked down a tree near Pensacola, killing a young child.
- September 9–18– Rip currents from distant Hurricane Florence killed a man in New Smyrna Beach and Playalinda Beach.
- October 10 — Hurricane Michael made landfall at 17:30 UTC near Mexico Beach, Florida with maximum sustained winds of 160 mph (255 km/h), making it the strongest hurricane on record to strike the Florida panhandle, and the first Category 5 hurricane to hit the United States since Hurricane Andrew in 1992. The estimated landfall central pressure was 919 millibars (27.1 inHg), the second most intense hurricane in Florida after the 1935 Labor Day hurricane. Michael killed 50 people in Florida, seven of them directly related to the storm's impacts. Statewide economic damage was estimated at $18.4 billion, with catastrophic damage in Mexico Beach and Tyndall Air Force Base. Damage at the base was estimated at $4.7 billion, where wind gusts reached 139 mph (224 km/h), and was estimated as strong as 172 mph (277 km/h).

=== 2019 ===
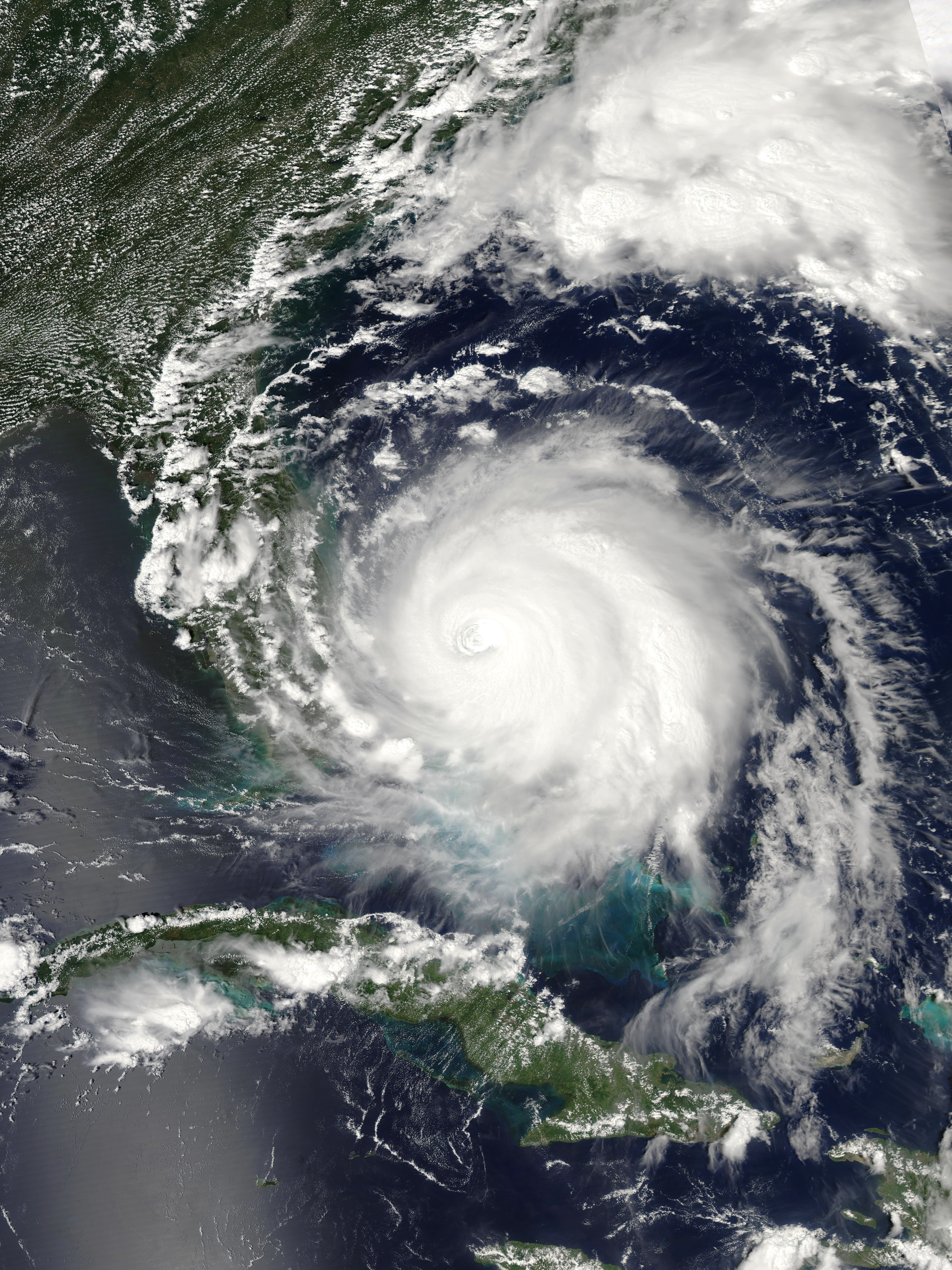
Dorian off the coast of Florida

- July 10–15 – Rip currents from Hurricane Barry killed a man in Panama City Beach.
- July 23 – Lightning from Tropical Depression Three struck a woman in Aventura as the depression approached the state's southeast coast.
- August 24 – The precursor low to Tropical Storm Erin moved across the southeastern portion of the state.
- September 1–4 – For two days, the NHC forecasted that powerful Hurricane Dorian would move ashore southeastern Florida. The hurricane ultimately stalled over The Bahamas and remained east of the state. Wind gusts reached 69 mph (111 km/h) in New Smyrna Beach. Dorian also produced a storm surge of 4.25 ft (1.30 m) in Fernandina Beach. Three people in the state died indirectly due to the hurricane – one person was electrocuted while trimming trees ahead of the storm, and two people died while preparing their homes. Damage totaled around $10 million in Duval County.
- September 12–13, 2019 – Rip currents from Tropical Storm Humberto killed a man in St. Johns County.
- September 30, 2019 – Large swells and rip currents generated by Hurricane Lorenzo killed a man in Vero Beach.
- October 18, 2019 – Former Tropical Storm Nestor transitioned into an extratropical cyclone and struck the Florida panhandle, causing storm surge flooding along the coast. Rainfall in the state reached 7.77 in (197 mm) in Pinellas County, resulting in street flooding. Nestor spawned at least three tornadoes in the state and left about 10,000 people without power.

== 2020–present ==
=== 2020 ===
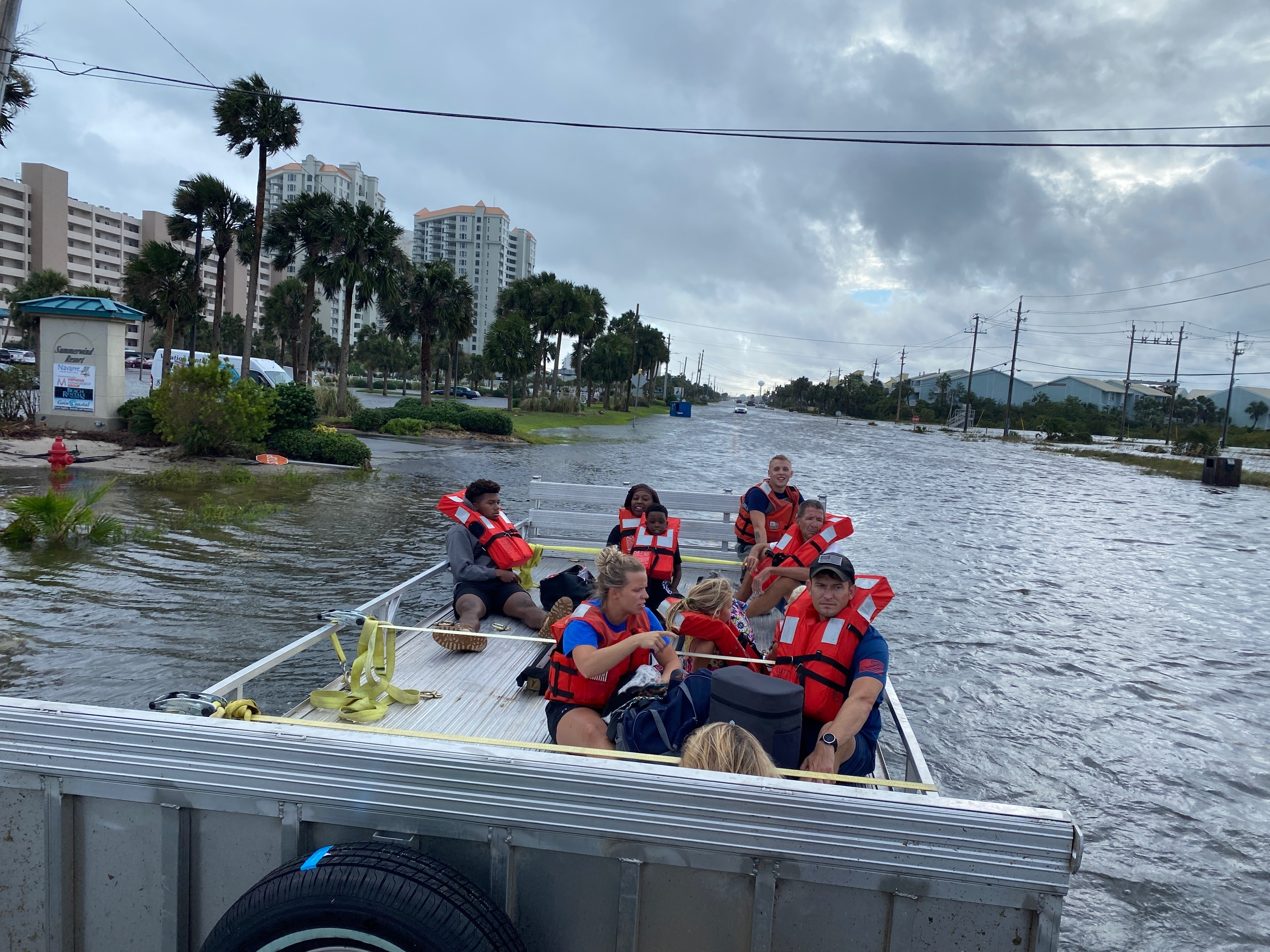
A Coast Guard rescue boat during Hurricane Sally

- May 13–14 – The precursor of Tropical Storm Arthur produced heavy rainfall across southern Florida, which resulted in an injury in Hollywood when the rains caused a ceiling to collapse.
- May 25–27 – The precursor of Tropical Storm Bertha dropped heavy rainfall, with a 24-hour total of 7.4 in (190 mm) in Miami; this was more than double the previous daily rainfall record. The rains flooded homes and roadways, especially in close proximity to canals. The storm caused the planned Crew Dragon Demo-2 launch from Cape Canaveral to be canceled.
- June 6–7 – While moving northward through the Gulf of Mexico, Tropical Storm Cristobal spawned six tornadoes in Florida, including an EF1 tornado near Orlando that damaged 42 homes and buildings.
- July 6 – The precursor low to Tropical Storm Fay moved ashore the Florida Gulf Coast, later developing into a tropical storm off the east coast of the United States.
- July 22 – Rip currents from Hurricane Hanna killed a swimmer in Sandestin Beach along the Gulf Coast.
- August 1–3 – Tropical Storm Isaias paralleled the east coast of Florida, dropping substantial amounts of rainfall and causing power outages to about 3,000 people in South Florida. Although the NHC issued hurricane warnings, the core of the storm remained offshore, and the peak wind gusts were 58 mph (93 km/h) in Dania Beach.
- August 23–24 – Hurricane Marco dropped heavy rainfall on the Florida Panhandle, reaching 11.81 in (300 mm) in Apalachicola, causing some flooding.
- August 26 – A strong squall from Tropical Storm Laura brought strong, gusty winds to Key West, causing sporadic damage. High surf and rip currents from the storm also caused a first responder to drown in St. George Island while trying to save two other swimmers.
- September 10–15 – Hurricane Sally slowly moved ashore southern Alabama, producing peak wind gusts of 92 mph (148 km/h) in Pensacola. The city also recorded a 5.6 ft (1.7 m) storm surge, which was the third-highest water level there after Hurricane Ivan in 2004 and the 1926 Miami hurricane. Sally dropped torrential rainfall across where it moved ashore, reaching 22.5 in (570 mm) near Pensacola. The rains and the storm surge caused significant flooding, resulting in hundreds of rescues. The storm damaged or destroyed thousands of structures. Three people died in Florida related to Sally, two due to drowning and one related to carbon monoxide poisoning while using a generator indoors. Damage in Escambia County alone totaled $309 million.
- October 4 – Rainbands from Tropical Storm Gamma near Mexico's Yucatán peninsula also produced rainfall in Florida.
- October 10 – Rip currents from Hurricane Delta killed two swimmers along the gulf coast.
- October 28 – As Hurricane Zeta struck Louisiana, it also produced wind gusts of 52 mph (84 km/h) in Pensacola, causing power outages to 51,200 people.
- November 7–9 – Tropical Storm Eta made two landfalls in Florida, bringing strong winds, storm surge, heavy rainfall, and flash flooding to much of the state.

=== 2021 ===
Satellite loop of Hurricane Elsa between 18:00 UTC on July 6, 2021, approaching landfall in Florida

- July 5–6 – Tropical Storm Elsa – Elsa then accelerated northward, and it made landfall in Taylor County, Florida at 14:30 UTC that same day with maximum winds of about 65 mph (100 km/h).
- August 15 – Tropical Storm Fred – Fred reached its peak intensity as a strong tropical storm with winds of 65 mph (105 km/h) at 18:00 UTC on August 16 shortly before making landfall a few miles southeast of Mexico Beach near Cape San Blas, Florida at a similar intensity around an hour later at 19:15 UTC.
- September 9 – Tropical Storm Mindy – At 01:15 UTC on September 9, a combination of surface observations and radar data indicated that Mindy had attained a peak intensity with maximum sustained winds of 60 mph (97 km/h) and a minimum barometric pressure of 1,000 millibars (30 inHg); as it made landfall on St. Vincent Island, Florida. These radar observations along with velocity data depicted Mindy with a well-defined circulation and spiral banding upon landfall. Over the next few hours, Mindy pushed inland across Florida's Big Bend region, skirting to the south of Tallahassee.

=== 2022 ===
Satellite imagery depicting Hurricane Ian making landfall in southwestern Florida on September 28, 2022

- June 2–6 – The precursor system to Tropical Storm Alex caused flash flooding in South Florida, inflicting moderate damage to the area.
- September 26–30 – Hurricane Ian passed through Florida throughout late September 2022. Ian first went over Dry Tortugas National Park in the Florida Keys as a Category 3 storm on September 26 and 27. Ian rapidly intensified to a Category 5 storm before making landfall at Cayo Costa, Fort Myers Beach, Fort Myers and Punta Gorda as a high-end Category 4 storm, respectively. Ian killed 72 people in Lee County (the Fort Myers area) and nine in Charlotte County (the Punta Gorda area), and brought massive storm surge to Southwestern Florida, where over 1 million people lost electricity. Its outer bands caused damage near Miami, where tornadoes were reported. Ian's persistent high winds and torrential rains also caused substantial and widespread damage to inland Central and Northeastern Florida as it crossed the peninsula. Although the system had weakened to tropical storm strength by the time it neared the Atlantic coast, a wind gust of 96 mph (154 km/h) was recorded in New Smyrna Beach.
- November 10 – Hurricane Nicole made landfall at 08:00 UTC on November 10 just south of Vero Beach on North Hutchinson Island as a low-end Category 1 storm with winds of 75 mph (121 km/h), becoming the first tropical cyclone to make landfall along the east coast of Florida at hurricane strength since Hurricane Katrina in 2005. As well, Nicole became only the third November hurricane to make landfall in Florida on record, alongside the 1935 Yankee hurricane and Hurricane Kate in 1985.

=== 2023 ===
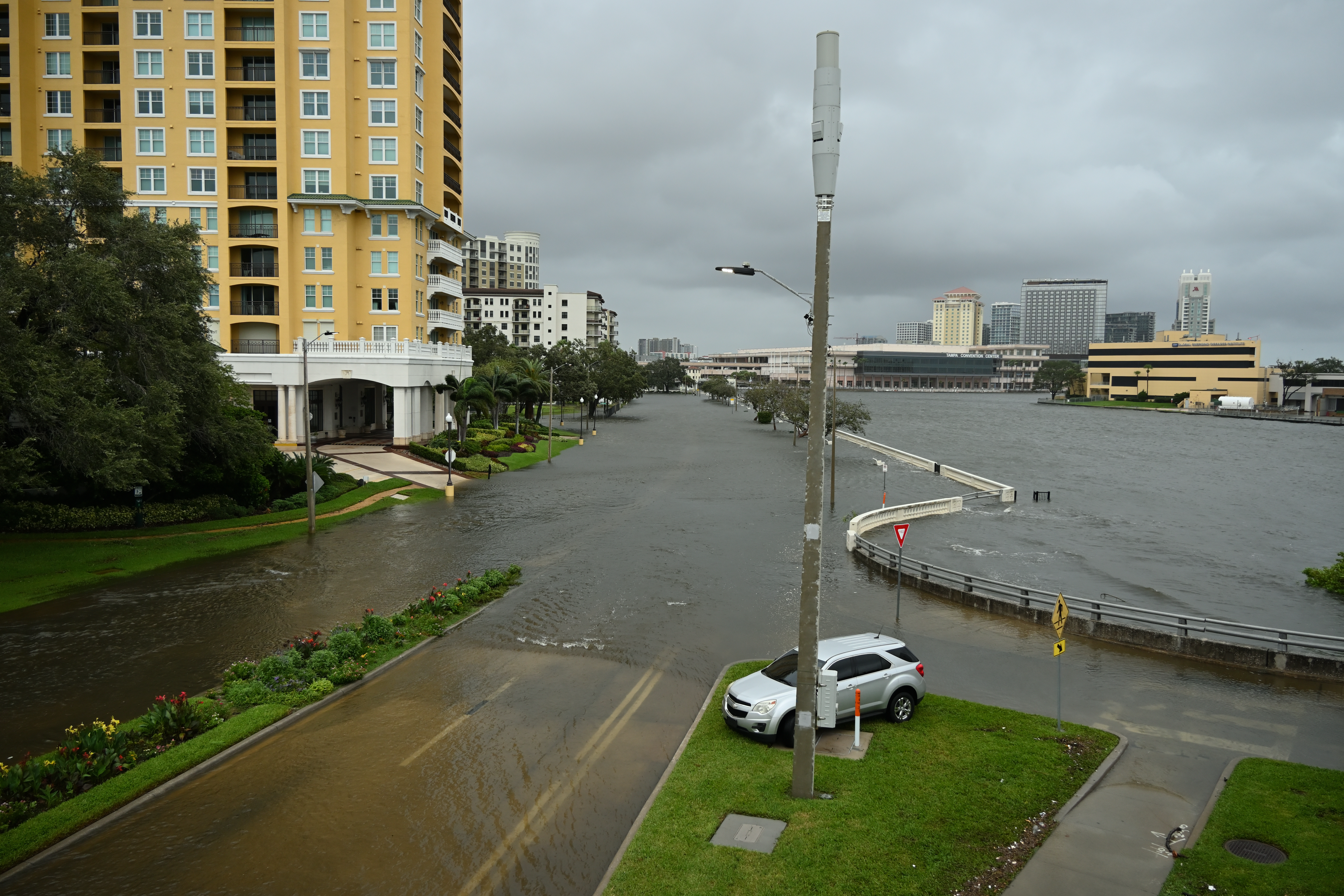
Storm surge flooding in Tampa from Hurricane Idalia

- June 1–3 – The remnants of Tropical Storm Arlene brought severe thunderstorms to South Florida, causing minor damage to the region.
- August 30 – Hurricane Idalia made landfall near Keaton Beach in the Big Bend region as a Category 3 storm with sustained winds of 115 mph (185 km/h), causing significant flooding and wind damage to the area. Storm surge near Cedar Key reached up to 8.9 feet (2.7 m), while locations further south near Tampa Bay and Clearwater experienced over 3 ft (0.91 m) of storm surge. Four people were killed in the state, with two of the fatalities occurring from traffic accidents as a result of the hazardous conditions.
- September 13 – Rip currents from distant Hurricane Lee killed a teenager in Fernandina Beach.

=== 2024 ===
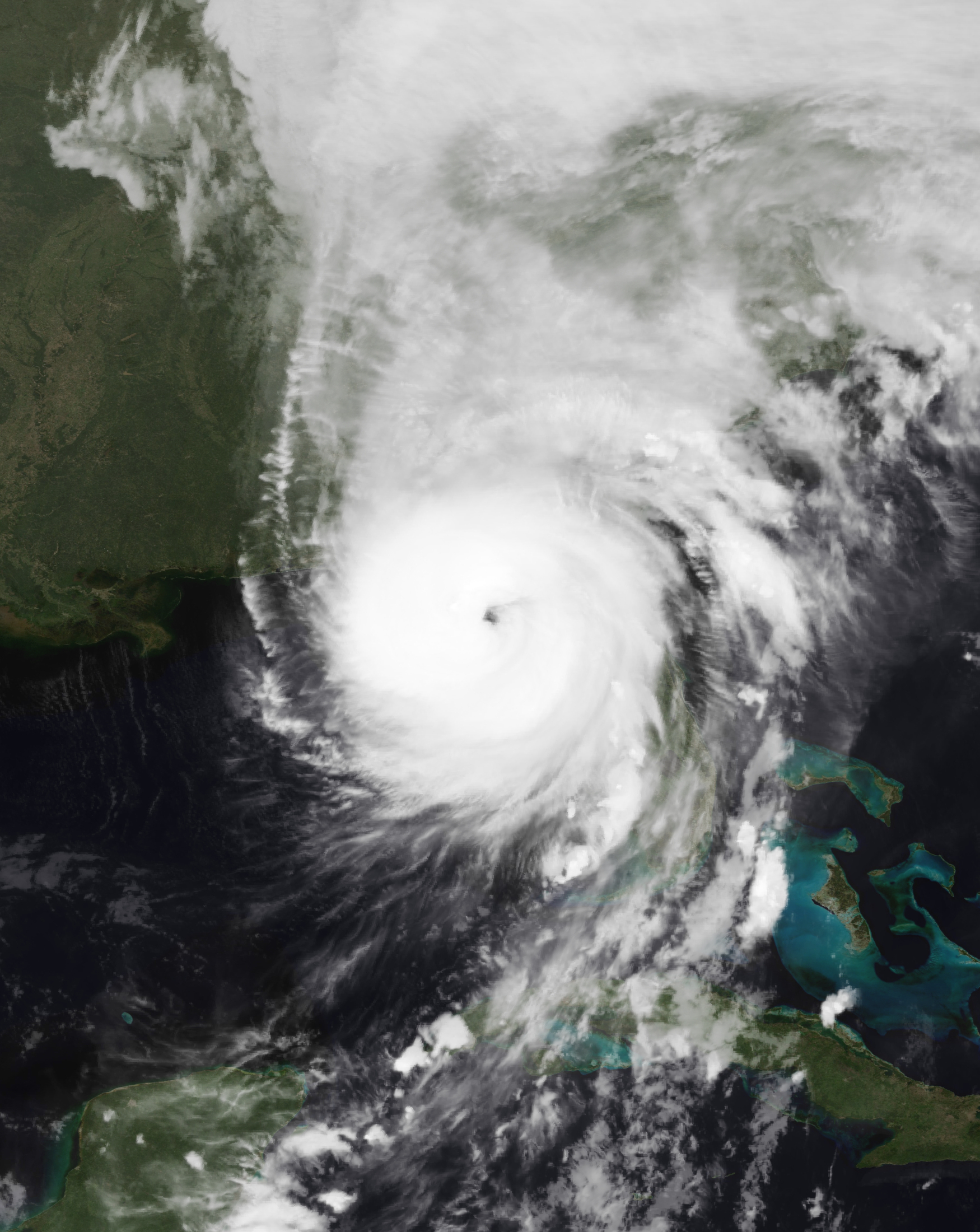
Hurricane Helene shortly before landfall on September 26, 2024

- August 5 – Hurricane Debby made landfall near peak intensity as a Category 1 hurricane with sustained winds of 80 mph (130 km/h) near Steinhatchee in the Big Bend region, 17 miles (27 km) from where Hurricane Idalia struck a year prior. Five fatalities were reported in the state after the passage of the storm, three of which occurred in traffic-related accidents.
- September 26 – Hurricane Helene made landfall at peak intensity near the mouth of the Aucilla River southwest of Perry as a Category 4 hurricane with sustained winds of 140 mph (220 km/h), becoming the strongest tropical cyclone to make landfall in the Big Bend region on record, as well as the third hurricane to make landfall in the area within a 13-month time period. Due to the large size of the storm, damaging winds and flooding impacted much of Florida's gulf coast. In areas closer to the Big Bend such as Steinhatchee, storm surge reached up to 9.63 feet (2.94 m), while areas as far south as Key West experienced storm surge of 1 to 3 feet (0.30 to 0.91 m). In total, around 1.3 million people lost power in the state, and 34 fatalities were reported.
- October 9–10 – Hurricane Milton made landfall near Siesta Key as a Category 3 hurricane with sustained winds of 115 mph (185 km/h), becoming the second major hurricane to strike Florida in under a two-week period. The storm brought significant flooding and damaging winds to much of the state. Up to 13 in (330 mm) of rain fell in Plant City, while wind gusts of up to 107 mph (172 km/h) were observed in Sarasota. Storm surge of 5 to 10 feet was recorded from Naples to Siesta Key, including Charlotte Harbor. Milton's outer rainbands also produced an extensive tornado outbreak across southern and central Florida, with a deadly tornado striking areas near Fort Pierce. In total, over 3 million people lost power in the state, multiple days-long boil water notices were launched throughout the Tampa Bay area, Tropicana Field in St. Petersburg lost its roof, and 32 fatalities were reported.
- November 9–10 — Hurricane Rafael churned up rip currents across much of the southern Florida coastline. The outer bands of the storm would bring impacts towards the Florida Keys, with 2 inches (51 mm) of reported rainfall and gusts up to 53 miles per hour (85 km/h).
- November 20–21 — The remnants of Tropical Storm Sara interacted with a cold front, dropping moisture along the coast of Southwest Florida and the Keys, while also bringing cold weather across much of the state.

=== 2025 ===
- July 4 – Tropical Storm Chantal formed off the coast of Florida and brought heavy rains to Central Florida.
- September 27 – Rip currents from Hurricane Imelda killed a swimmer in Daytona Beach.

=== 2026 ===
Eglin Air Force Base radar loop of Isaias on October 9, 2026, approaching landfall in the Florida panhandle

- October 9 – Hurricane Isaias made landfall near Destin as a Category 2 hurricane with winds of 105 miles per hour (169 km/h) producing significant damage across western portions of the Florida panhandle. A maximum wind gust of 118 mph (190 km/h) was observed near Jay, and storm surge reached 5.51 ft (1.68 m) in Panama City. In total, six people were killed in the state.

== Monthly statistics ==
Number of Florida tropical cyclones since 2000, by month
| Month | Number of tropical cyclones |
|---|---|
| April | 1 |
| May | 6 |
| June | 10 |
| July | 11 |
| August | 25 |
| September | 33 |
| October | 15 |
| November | 7 |
| December | 1 |

== Deadliest storms ==
Deadliest storms2000–present
| Name | Year | Number of deaths | Ref |
|---|---|---|---|
| Ian | 2022 | 150 | |
| Irma | 2017 | 84 | |
| Michael | 2018 | 50 | |
| Milton | 2024 | 42 | |
| Frances | 2004 | 37 | |
| Helene | 2024 | 34 | |
| Wilma | 2005 | 30 | |
| Charley | 2004 | 28 | |
| Ivan | 2004 | 14 | |
| Dennis | 2005 | 14 | |

== See also ==
- List of Cuba hurricanes
- Hurricanes in the Bahama Archipelago
