= Tropical Storm Bonnie (2010) =

Atlantic tropical storm in 2010

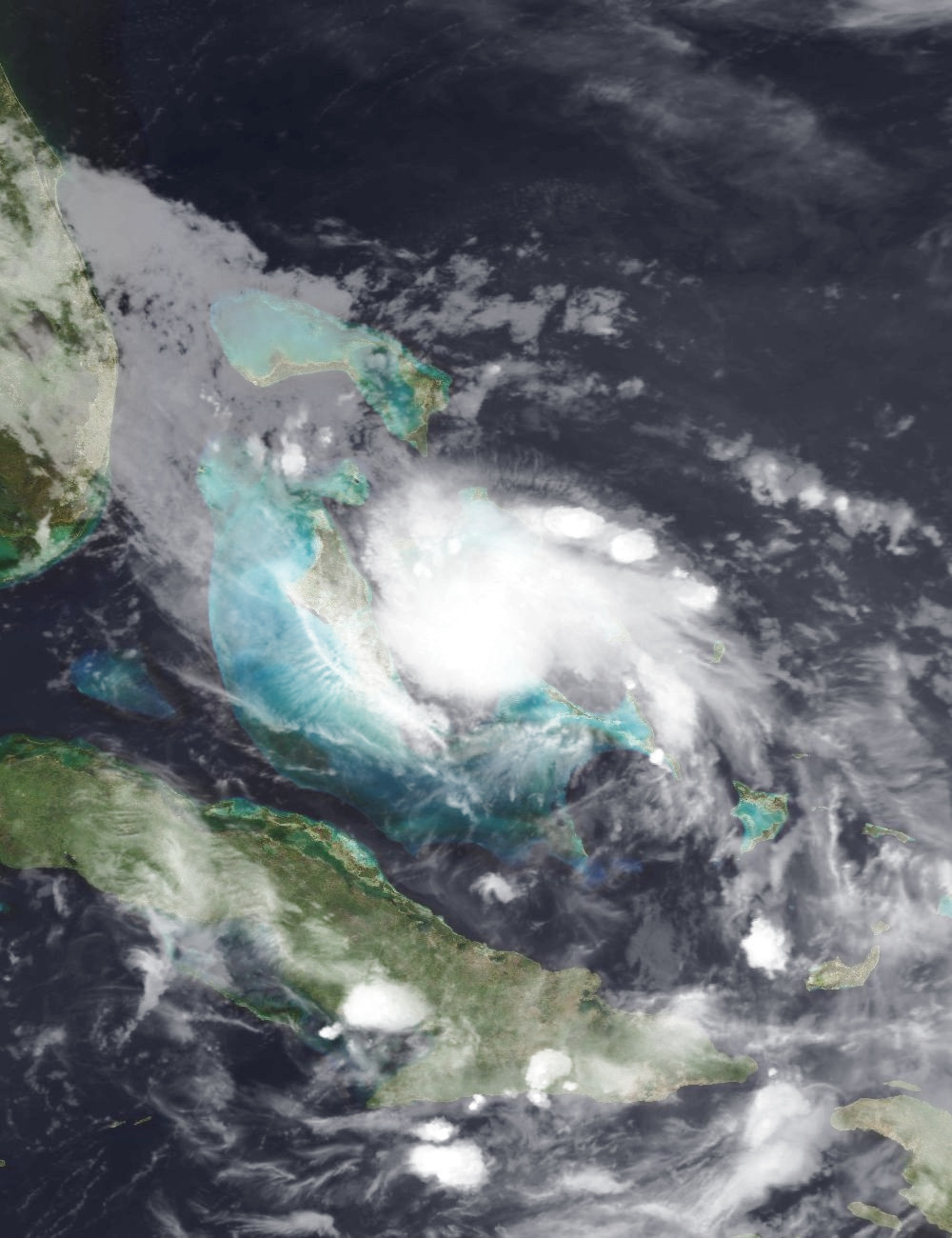
- Tropical Storm Bonnie near peak intensity over the Bahamas on July 23

Meteorological history
- Formed: July 22, 2010
- Remnant low: July 24, 2010
- Dissipated: July 25, 2010

Tropical storm
- 1-minute sustained (SSHWS/NWS)
- Highest winds: 45 mph (75 km/h)
- Lowest pressure: 1005 mbar (hPa); 29.68 inHg

Overall effects
- Fatalities: 1 total
- Damage: $1.36 million (2010 USD)
- Areas affected: Puerto Rico, Hispaniola, Turks and Caicos, Bahamas, Florida
- IBTrACS
- Part of the 2010 Atlantic hurricane season

Tropical Storm Bonnie was a small and rather weak tropical storm that brought squally weather to the northern Caribbean Sea and Gulf Coast of the United States in July 2010. The third tropical cyclone and second named storm of the 2010 Atlantic hurricane season, Bonnie developed from a tropical wave over the Bahamas on July 22. It strengthened to a tropical storm while crossing the islands, and made landfall on the southeastern coast of Florida the following day. Inland, Bonnie weakened to a tropical depression before entering the Gulf of Mexico, where its surface circulation dissipated on July 24. The remnants of the storm moved ashore between Louisiana and Mississippi early on July 25, prompting severe thunderstorm and tornado warnings in the area.

The precursor to Bonnie produced considerable amounts of rainfall across the Greater Antilles, resulting in light to moderate flooding. In the Dominican Republic, hundreds of people were displaced, and several bridges collapsed over rushing waters. One person drowned after being swept away by a swollen river in Puerto Rico. Elsewhere, light amounts of rainfall was reported in Haiti, the Bahamas and Florida. Effects were more severe from the remnants of Bonnie, with heavier rain amounts and higher winds reported near the Gulf Coast, especially in Louisiana. Damage as a result of the storm and its remnants totaled $1.36 million (2010 USD).

== Meteorological history ==
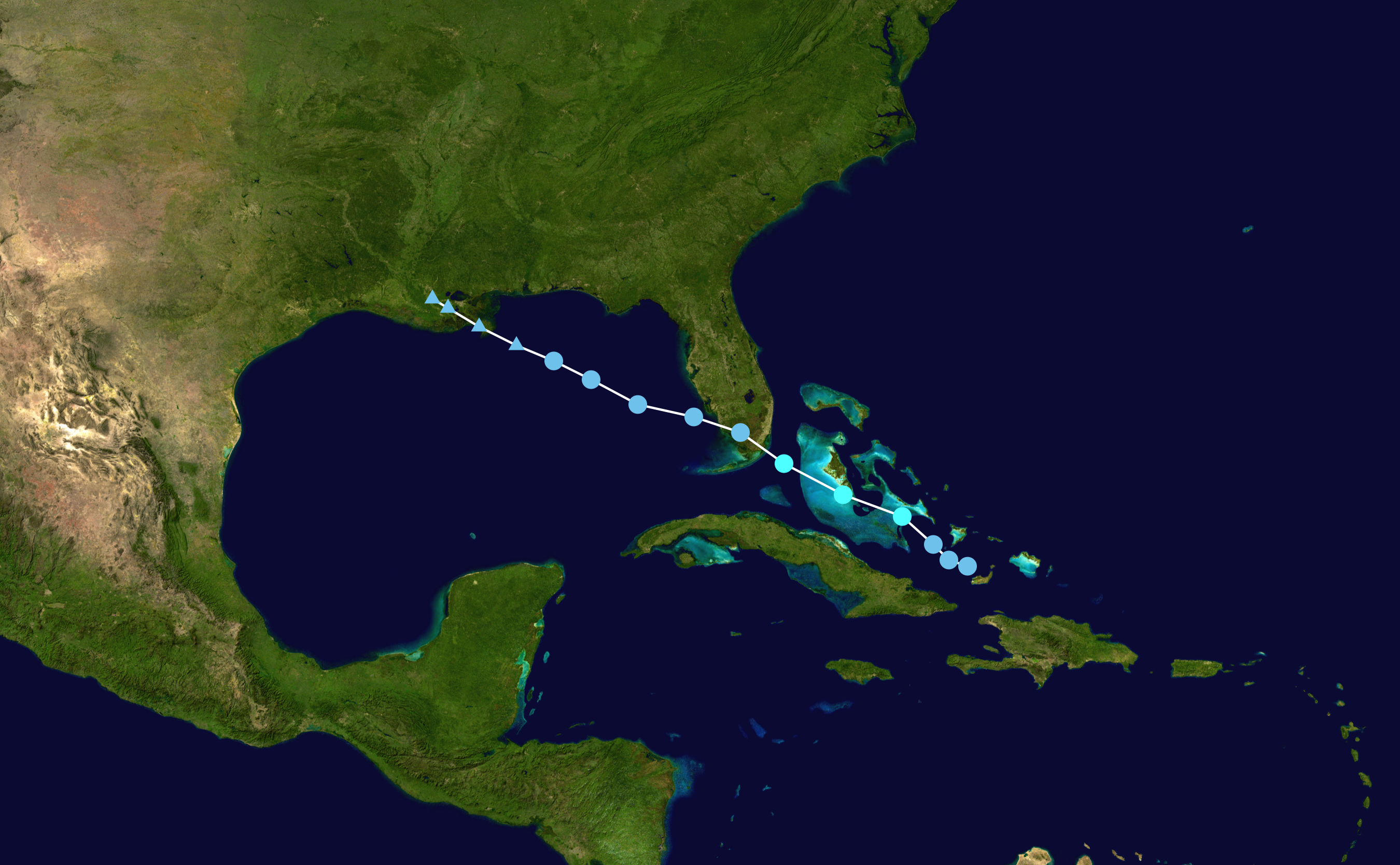
Map plotting the storm's track and intensity, according to the Saffir–Simpson scale Map key Saffir–Simpson scale Tropical depression (≤38 mph, ≤62 km/h) Tropical storm (39–73 mph, 63–118 km/h) Category 1 (74–95 mph, 119–153 km/h) Category 2 (96–110 mph, 154–177 km/h) Category 3 (111–129 mph, 178–208 km/h) Category 4 (130–156 mph, 209–251 km/h) Category 5 (≥157 mph, ≥252 km/h) Unknown Storm type Tropical cyclone Subtropical cyclone Extratropical cyclone, remnant low, tropical disturbance, or monsoon depression

On July 10, a tropical wave exited the African coast and moved westward over the open Atlantic for several days. Initially, the associated weather activity was limited to weak showers, and environmental conditions were not forecast to become conducive for significant organization. Although upper-level wind shear remained somewhat adverse, a process of slow development became evident by July 19 as surface pressures began to fall. The wave proceeded along the extreme northeastern Caribbean, where convective activity waxed and waned due to periods of variable wind shear and brief land interaction with Hispaniola. By July 22, thundershower activity reestablished over the Bahamas, with a distinct area of low pressure centered between the islands of Acklins and Great Inagua. Satellite observations confirmed a closed circulation, leading the National Hurricane Center (NHC) to issue the formation of Tropical Depression Three around 1500 UTC. However, post-storm analysis indicated that a depression had developed nine hours earlier than operationally confirmed. Upon its formation, the depression was forecast to be steered to the west-northwest along a well-established subtropical ridge. Later that day, minimum pressure dropped to 1006 mbar (29.74 inHg), and satellite imagery showed an establishment of favorable outflow in nearly all quadrants. Although its cloud pattern remained disorganized—with the circulation center disassociated from the deepest convection—a reconnaissance aircraft flight into the cyclone found that the winds had increased. It was therefore upgraded to Tropical Storm Bonnie southeast of Nassau, Bahamas, about five hours after NHC initiated advisories on the system.

Bonnie shortly after its entrance into the Gulf of Mexico

Around 2100 UTC, Bonnie moved over Ragged Island in the Bahamas with winds of 40 mph (64 km/h), and shortly thereafter it attained its peak intensity with maximum sustained winds of 45 mph (72 km/h). Due to increasingly unfavorable conditions aloft, little change in intensity occurred during the following day as the storm accelerated toward Florida. Though tropical storm-force winds prevailed, they were confined to a few rainbands to the north and east of the center at that time, with the deepest convection dislocated over southeast Florida. On July 23 at 1430 UTC, the center of Bonnie made landfall near Elliott Key with winds of 40 mph (64 km/h). Interaction with land caused the organization to deteriorate further, and its corresponding convection quickly diminished. In addition, a second reconnaissance flight affirmed a lack of significant winds; it is estimated the cyclone lost tropical storm status around 1800 UTC that same day. On the morning of July 24, deep convection briefly redeveloped over the center as Bonnie emerged into the Gulf of Mexico. Despite the redevelopment, the storm subsequently entered a region of intense upper-level winds, causing associated convection to become sheared away rapidly. Embedded within a well-established steering flow, Bonnie further degenerated to a tight swirl of low clouds, with no more than a few remaining patches of strong thunderstorms. Subsequent satellite images confirmed Bonnie no longer maintained a definable structure; following the final advisory by the NHC, the system was pronounced dissipated while located about 100 mi (160 km) from the mouth of the Mississippi River. The remnant low of Bonnie drifted west-northwestward before dissolving over southeast Louisiana on July 25.

== Preparations ==
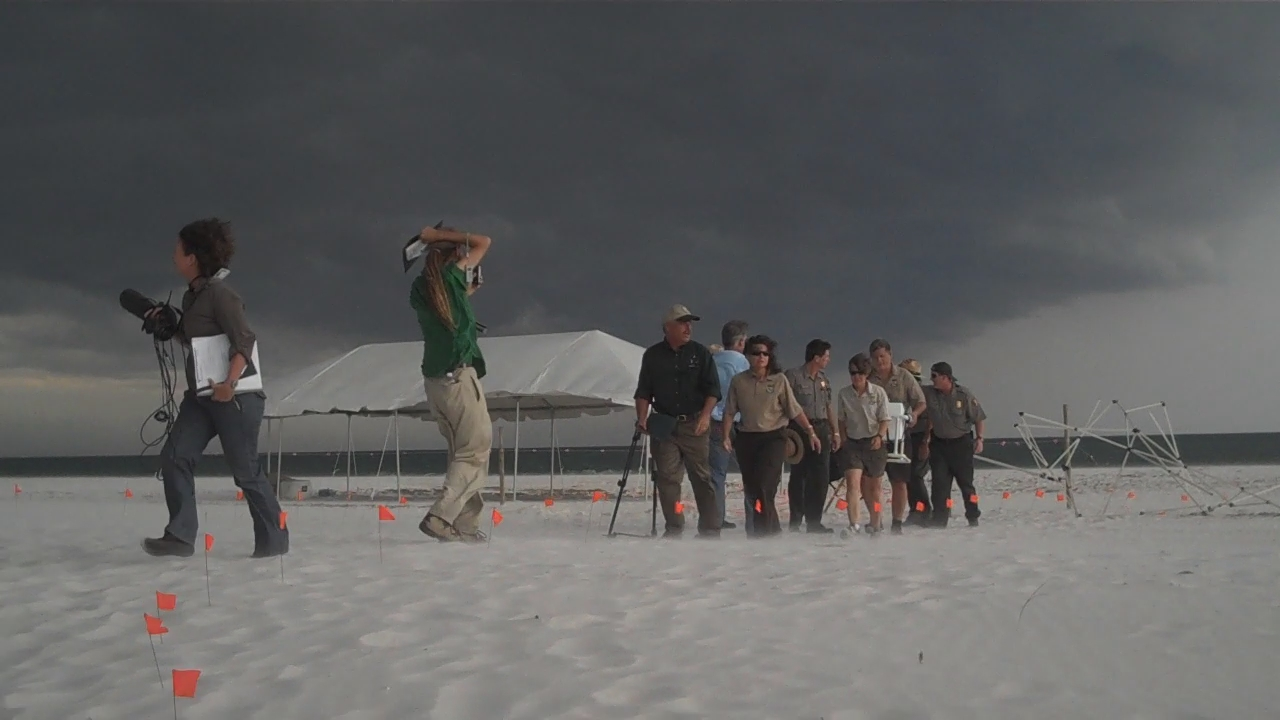
USFWS staff in Panama City, Florida watching Bonnie approaching the state on July 23

When the NHC initiated advisories on Bonnie, a tropical storm warning was issued for the central and northwest islands of the Bahamas. In Florida, a tropical storm watch was issued for Golden Beach northward to Jupiter Inlet, and included Lake Okeechobee. In addition, a tropical storm warning was issued from Golden Beach to Bonita Springs on the west coast of the state, and included the Florida Keys and Florida Bay. By early July 23, the tropical storm warning from Golden Beach to Bonita Springs was discontinued, while a tropical storm warning was issued from Englewood to Deerfield Beach, Florida. Six hours later, a tropical storm watch was put into effect for Destin, Florida to Morgan City, Louisiana; it was later upgraded to a tropical storm warning. Three hours later, the tropical storm watch from Deerfield Beach to Jupiter Inlet, Florida and all tropical storm warnings in the Bahamas were discontinued. All tropical storm watches and warnings had been discontinued by 1500 UTC July 24, shortly before Bonnie dissipated.

Three cruise ships, Carnival Pride, Carnival Destiny, and Grandeur of the Seas had to alter their courses due to the presence of Bonnie. Due to the threat of a tropical storm, Louisiana Governor Bobby Jindal declared a state of emergency on July 22. Along the Gulf Coast, concerns arose regarding the potential effects of the storm on the BP oil spill earlier in the year. Due to risk of intoxicated storm surge, authorities prepared for possible evacuations of low-lying areas along coastlines. On July 23, Admiral Thad Allen ordered the oil spill site to be evacuated, as Bonnie posed a safety threat to nearly 2,000 people in that area. The ships and vessels in the area began preparation for evacuation on July 24. Closer to shore, approximately 1,300 fishing boats laying boom had to evacuate.

== Impact ==
=== Caribbean ===
The precursor to Bonnie brought significant rainfall to parts of Puerto Rico and Hispaniola, leading to widespread flooding. In Puerto Rico, one person drowned after being caught in a swollen river, and roughly 1,500 people required evacuation in the Dominican Republic. According to officials in the Dominican Republic, the system produced more than 4 in (100 mm) of rain across the territory. Several towns in the country were isolated after bridges collapsed. Some light flooding also occurred in Artibonite, Haiti, though no damage was reported.

As Bonnie moved through the Bahamas, residents stocked up on food and water as a precautionary measure; however, no major preparations took place. Most businesses remained open during the system's passage and schools were already closed for the summer. Throughout the islands, the effects from Bonnie were relatively minimal. Heavy rain fell across a few islands and copious lightning was reported. No known damage or loss of life took place.

=== United States ===
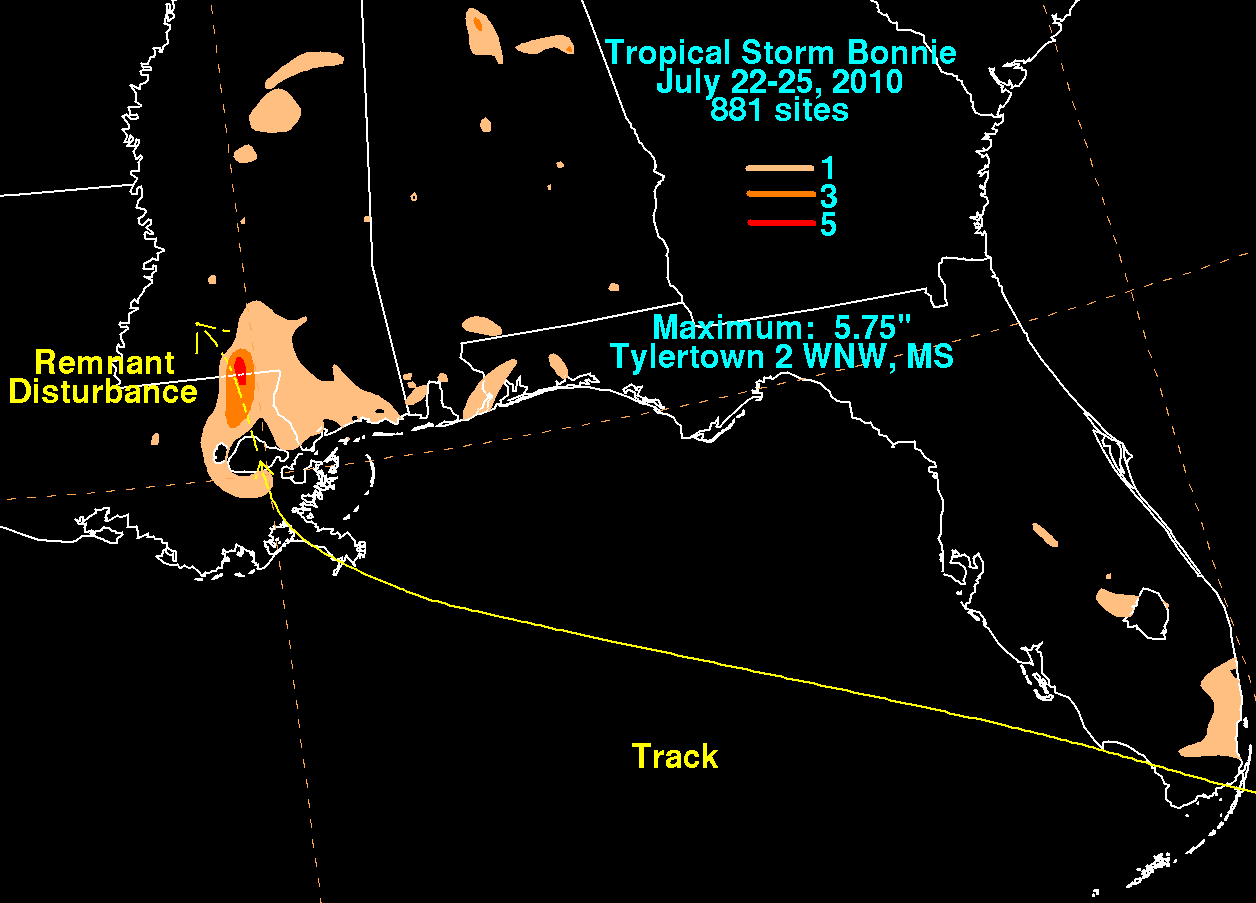
Rainfall from Bonnie in the United States

Due to the weak and disorganized structure of the storm, its effects upon landfall in Florida were minimal. Gusty winds damaged newly planted trees, and some power lines were downed; throughout the state, roughly 14,000 people lost power. A storm surge of 0.94 ft (0.29 m) was measured at Virginia Key. Tropical storm-force winds were recorded in several areas, although sustained winds of over 40 mph (64 km/h) were confined to Virginia Key. Rainfall was also minimal, with a maximum of 3.25 in (83 mm) falling in northern Miami-Dade County. Overall, monetary losses as a result of the storm in Florida amounted to $2,000 (2010 USD). In Pinellas County, one person was hospitalized after being struck by lightning at Fred Howard Park on July 24.

On July 25, the remnants of Bonnie brought torrential rainfall to parts of Louisiana. In a 90-minute span, between 8 and 9 in (200 and 230 mm) of rain fell in West Baton Rouge Parish. About 110 homes were flooded throughout the parish, resulting in $500,000 (2010 USD) losses. Along Highway 15, 2 ft (0.61 m) of water was reported to have covered the road. In Washington Parish, more than 20 bridges and roads were washed out by flash flooding, the losses is about $200,000 (2010 USD). Strong thunderstorms associated with the system also produced strong winds, estimated up to 69 mph (111 km/h), which downed several trees, leading to $6,000 (2010 USD) losses. A second day of severe weather on July 26 brought hurricane-force wind gusts to portions of Vernon Parish; two chicken houses were destroyed by the winds, killing 22,000 chickens. Losses from the winds were estimated at $310,000 (2010 USD). After moving through Louisiana, Bonnie's remnants brought heavy rain to parts of Texas. In Hidalgo County, U.S. Route 69 was reportedly covered with high water.

Further inland, moisture from Bonnie combined with a cold front to produce widespread thunderstorms over Arkansas, Mississippi and Tennessee. In Arkansas, lightning from a severe thunderstorm knocked out power to much of the city of Rison after striking a transformer. Significant wind damage took place in Dallas County where awnings were blown off homes, structures sustained roof damage, and trees were felled. Heavy rains also triggered localized flash flooding, covering several highways. Throughout the state, storm damage was estimated at $344,000 (2010 USD).

== See also ==
- Other storms named Bonnie
- List of Florida hurricanes (2000-present)
- Tropical Depression Five (2010) – Took a similar track later in the season
