= Tropical cyclones in 2002 =

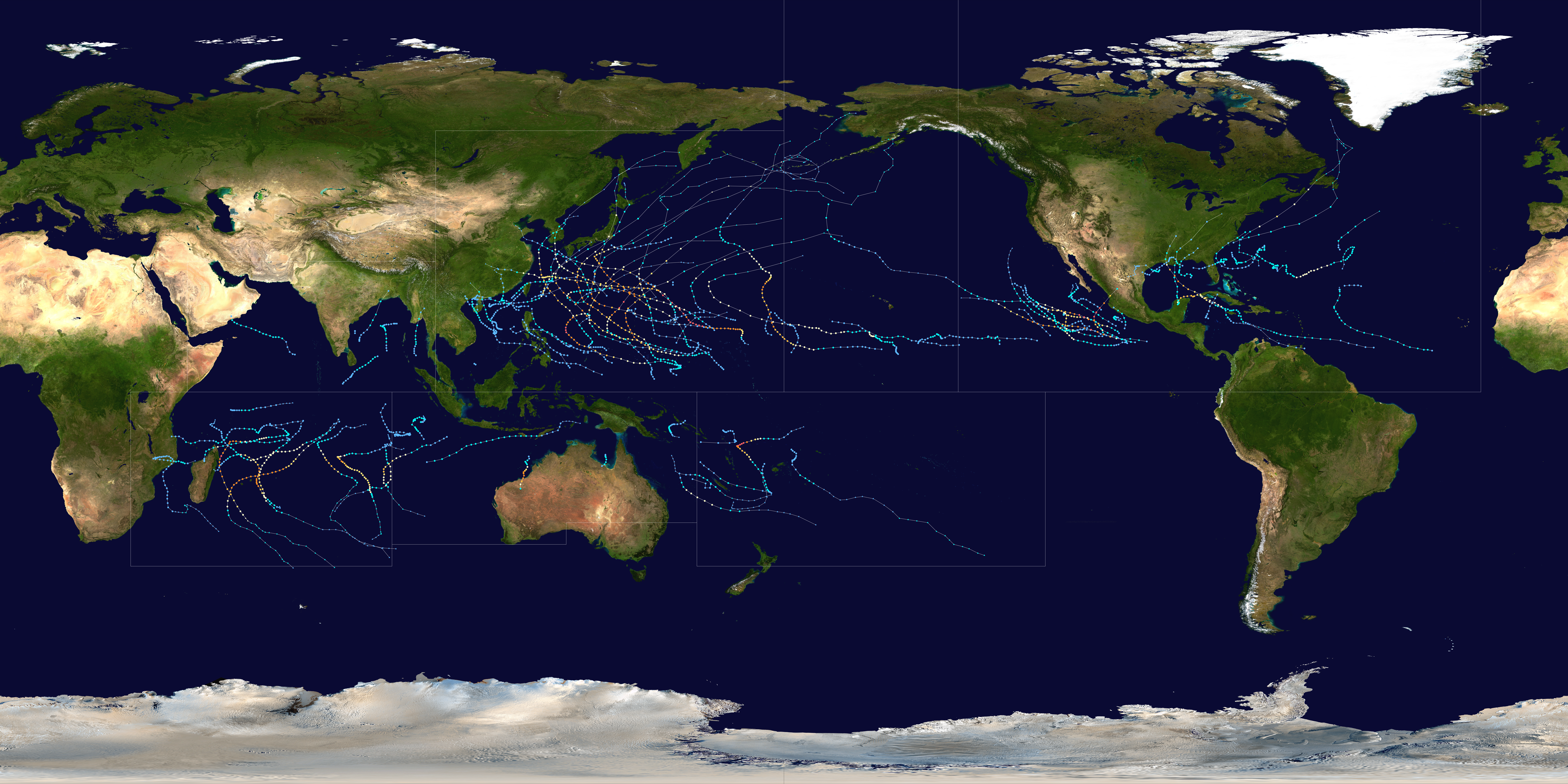
- Year summary map

Year boundaries
- First system: Cyprien and Bernie
- Formed: December 30, 2001
- Last system: Delfina
- Dissipated: January 9, 2003

Strongest system
- Name: Zoe
- Lowest pressure: 890 mbar (hPa); 26.28 inHg

Longest lasting system
- Name: Kyle
- Duration: 22 days

Year statistics
- Total systems: 121
- Named systems: 78
- Total fatalities: 1,068 total
- Total damage: $12.42 billion (2002 USD)
Related articles
- 2002 Atlantic hurricane season
- 2002 Pacific hurricane season
- 2002 Pacific typhoon season
- 2002 North Indian Ocean cyclone season
- 2001–02 South-West Indian Ocean cyclone season
- 2002–03 South-West Indian Ocean cyclone season
- 2001–02 Australian region cyclone season
- 2002–03 Australian region cyclone season
- 2001–02 South Pacific cyclone season
- 2002–03 South Pacific cyclone season

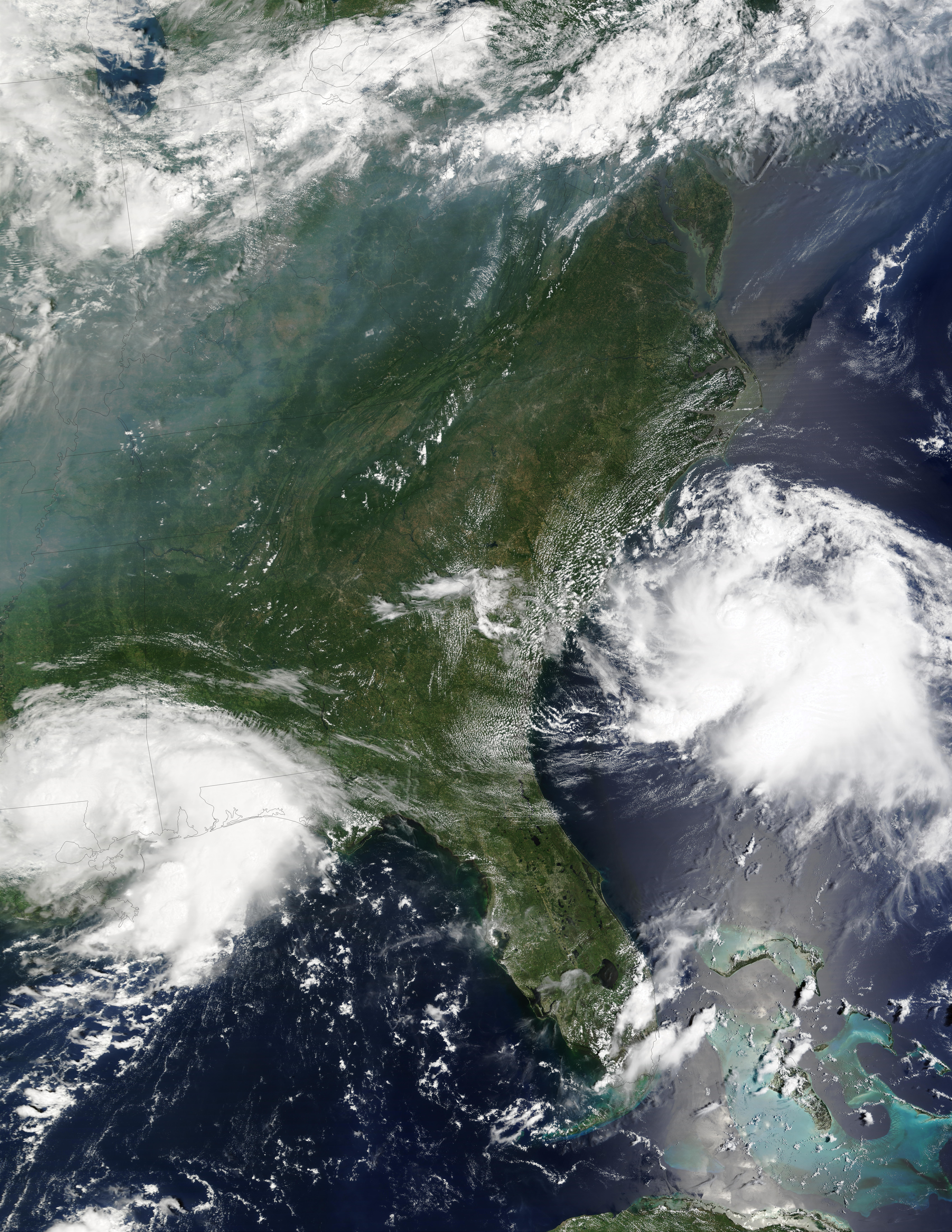
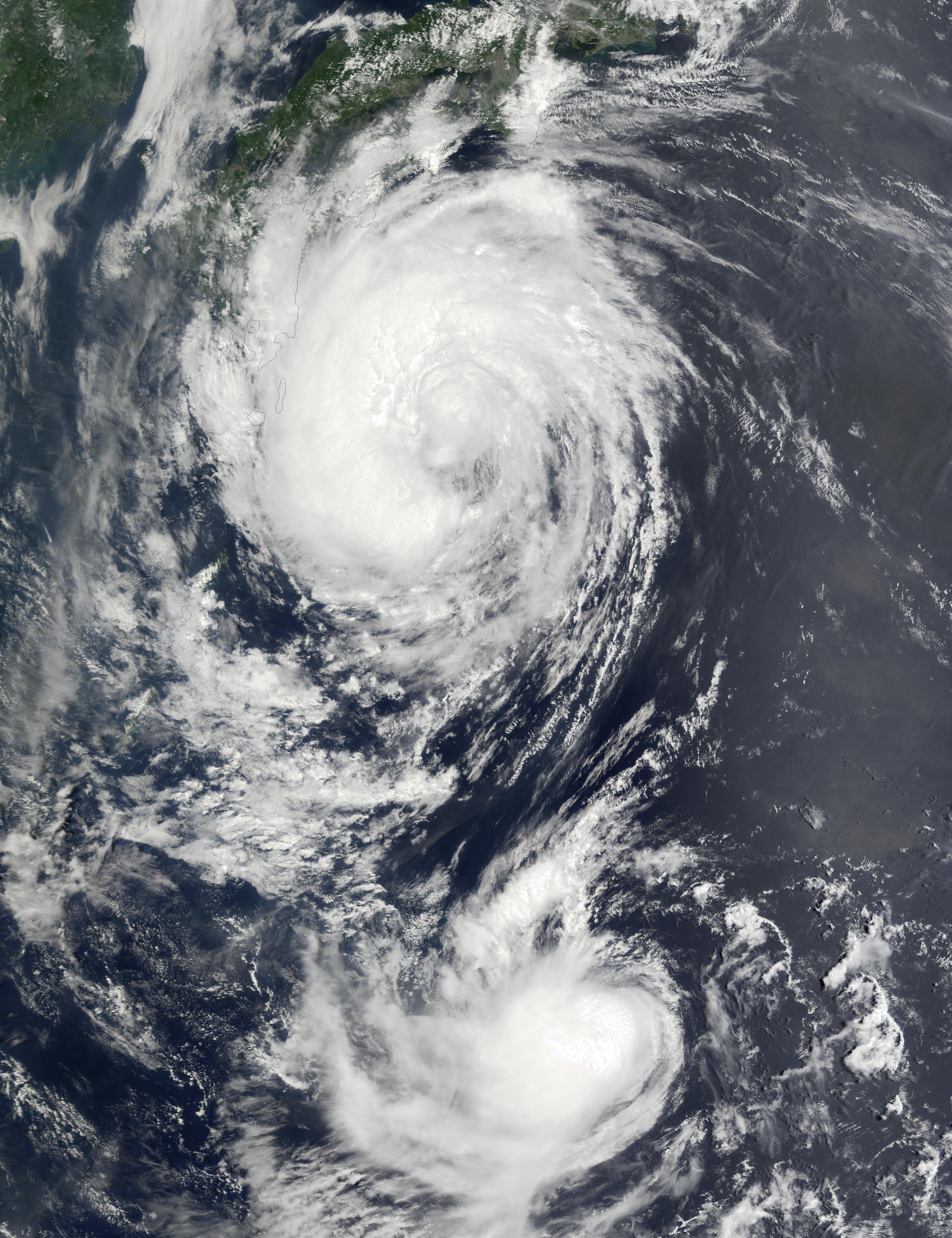
In the North Atlantic basin, the remnants of Bertha dump heavy rainfall in Louisiana and Mississippi while a tropical depression formed off the North Carolina coast on August 5. The said tropical depression would eventually become Tropical Storm Cristobal. Meanwhile on the Western Pacific basin, both typhoons Fengshen (north) and Fung-wong (south) were undergoing the Fujiwhara effect after interacting with each other on July 25.

During 2002, tropical cyclones formed within seven different tropical cyclone basins, located within various parts of the Atlantic, Pacific and Indian Oceans. Throughout the year, a total of 123 tropical cyclones formed, of which 80 tropical cyclones developed enough to be named by either a Regional Specialized Meteorological Center (RSMC) or a Tropical Cyclone Warning Center (TCWC). The strongest system was Cyclone Zoe, with a barometric pressure of 890 hPa (26 inHg). The costliest and deadliest tropical cyclone of the year was Typhoon Rusa, killing 238 in South Korea and causing $4.2 billion (2002 USD) in damages. 26 Category 3 tropical cyclones, including eight Category 5 tropical cyclones formed in 2002. The accumulated cyclone energy (ACE) index for 2002 (seven basins combined), as calculated by Colorado State University was 812 units.

Tropical cyclone activity in each basin is under the authority of an RSMC. The National Hurricane Center (NHC) is responsible for tropical cyclones in the North Atlantic and East Pacific. The Central Pacific Hurricane Center (CPHC) is responsible for tropical cyclones in the Central Pacific. Both the NHC and CPHC are subdivisions of the National Weather Service. Activity in the West Pacific is monitored by the Japan Meteorological Agency (JMA). Systems in the North Indian Ocean are monitored by the India Meteorological Department (IMD). The Météo-France located in Réunion (MFR) monitors tropical activity in the South-West Indian Ocean. The Australian region is monitored by five TCWCs that are under the coordination of the Australian Bureau of Meteorology (BOM). Similarly, the South Pacific is monitored by both the Fiji Meteorological Service (FMS) and the Meteorological Service of New Zealand Limited. Other, unofficial agencies that provide additional guidance in tropical cyclone monitoring include the Philippine Atmospheric, Geophysical and Astronomical Services Administration (PAGASA) and the Joint Typhoon Warning Center (JTWC).

== Global atmospheric and hydrological conditions ==
In the seven basins, there are a variety of different factors that impact tropical cyclogenesis. One of the most important factors is the presence or lack of El Niño–Southern Oscillation, which was present for much of the second half of 2002. El Niño is caused by the weakening of trade winds. This leads to the formation of a band of warm ocean water in the equatorial Eastern Pacific basin, marked by a reduction in upwelling.

The El Niño phenomenon has global effects on cyclone formation, development, and tracks. In the Atlantic Ocean, El Niño years see less active hurricane seasons due to stronger westerly winds, which cause increased vertical wind shear, inhibiting cyclonic development. By contrast, the Eastern Pacific basin exhibits lower wind shear and higher sea surface temperatures, leading to more active cyclone seasons. In the Western Pacific, tropical cyclone formation shifts eastward, without a major change in activity; thus, a typhoon that would normally affect China might shift to instead impact Micronesia. In the Southern Hemisphere, the situation in the Northern Hemisphere is mirrored: the Australian region sees fewer cyclones, while the South Pacific becomes more active. All these factors were present in 2002: the Atlantic hurricane season was slightly below-average, the Eastern Pacific had an unusually high number of major hurricanes, the Western Pacific saw a dearth of activity in the South China Sea in conjunction with an abnormally strong subtropical ridge, and the Australian region saw no storms in the second half of 2002, while the South Pacific season was one of the most intense on record.

== Summary ==
=== North Atlantic Ocean ===
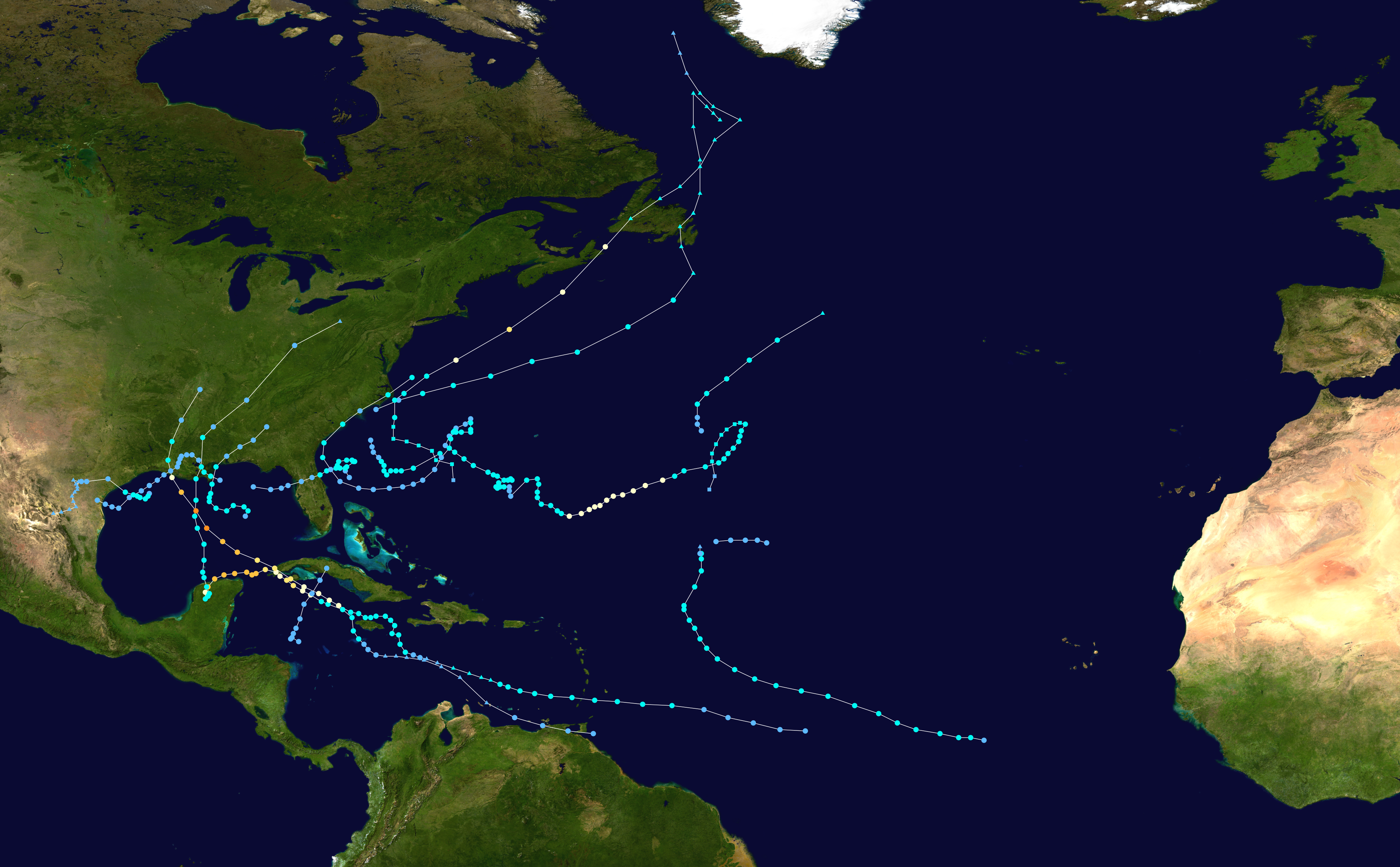
2002 Atlantic hurricane season summary map

The 2002 season was near-normal in activity, with twelve tropical storms forming, but had a below-average amount of more intense storms, with only four hurricanes and two major hurricanes. (Note: Hurricanes reaching Category 3 (111 miles per hour or 179 kilometers per hour) and higher on the five-level Saffir–Simpson wind speed scale are considered major hurricanes.) A more accurate picture of the season's activity is its accumulated cyclone energy (ACE), which gives higher weight to more intense tropical cyclones and longer-lived tropical cyclones – thus, a season with many weak and short-lived storms will have a lower ACE, while a season with a few long-lived intense hurricanes will have a higher ACE despite superficially appearing to be a less active season. The ACE for the 2002 season was 65.1, only three-fourths of the long-term average of 87.5, classifying the 2002 season as slightly below-average.

The season had a rather late start, with the first storm, Arthur, forming on 14 July, causing one death in the American Southeast. Arthur was followed by five more tropical storms over the next two months, of which several caused significant damage, most notably Tropical Storm Fay, which made landfall in Texas on 7 August, causing $4.5 million in damage. Tropical Storms Bertha and Cristobal also caused minor damage and deaths, to the Gulf Coast and Eastern Seaboard, respectively. On 8 September, Subtropical Storm Gustav formed between the Bahamas and Bermuda, becoming the first-ever Atlantic subtropical cyclone to receive a name from the regular naming list. Three days later, Gustav intensified into a hurricane, becoming the latest first hurricane of the season since 1941. The hurricane would later affect land, causing several hundreds of thousands of dollars of damage along the East Coast. A few days later, Tropical Storm Hanna formed, which would soon make landfall in and cause $20 million in damage to the Gulf Coast.

On 14 September, a depression formed near Trinidad and Tobago, then degenerated into a tropical wave the next day. As the tropical wave moved west over the next few days, it reorganized as a tropical depression, intensifying into Tropical Storm Isidore on 18 September. The next day, Isidore intensified into a hurricane, making landfall in western Cuba on 20 September before turning west and making landfall on the northern coast of the Yucatán Peninsula as a Category 3 hurricane the next day. After the landfall, the storm turned north, hitting Louisiana as a tropical storm on 26 September before dissipating. Isidore was the most destructive storm of the season, causing $1.28 billion and killing 22 people, mostly in the Yucatán Peninsula. The next storm to affect land was Hurricane Lili, which formed on 21 September east of the Lesser Antilles. After intensifying into a tropical storm, Lili degenerated into a tropical wave, reforming as a tropical storm southeast of Jamaica on 26 September. Lili became a hurricane near the Cayman Islands and made landfall in western Cuba on 1 October at Category 2 intensity. Moving northwest, the storm intensified into a Category 4 hurricane, reaching its peak intensity of 145 mph (235 km/h), the highest wind speed of any Atlantic hurricane in 2002. Lili weakened to a Category 1 hurricane, making landfall in Louisiana on 3 October before dissipating the next day. With $1.16 billion in damage and 15 deaths to Louisiana and the Caribbean Islands, Lili was the second-costliest and second-deadliest Atlantic hurricane of 2002. About a week after Lili dissipated, the long-lived Hurricane Kyle, which had formed on 20 September, approached the Carolinas as a tropical storm. Kyle made two separate landfalls on 11 October, one in South Carolina and one in North Carolina, causing $5 million in damage before becoming extratropical the next day. Its remnants caused one death in Britain. Lasting twenty-two days, Kyle was the longest-lived tropical cyclone of 2002 and the fourth-longest-lived Atlantic hurricane ever.

The 2002 season was an anomaly, setting records for both activity and inactivity. It broke the record for the most active September, with eight named storms forming, tied in 2007 and 2010 and broken in 2020. However, the length of the season – the amount of time from the first storm to the last storm – was only three months, the shortest since 1983. There was also an unusual lack of storms forming from tropical waves. Usually the most common source of tropical cyclogenesis, only Dolly, Isidore, and Lili formed this way, with the other storms forming from subtropical or non-tropical systems. This abnormal activity was caused by a moderate El Niño, which allowed high wind shear to exist across the Atlantic except in September, when the El Niño temporarily weakened and wind shear decreased. Wind shear was especially high in areas with high tropical wave formation levels, such as the Caribbean Sea.

=== Eastern Pacific Ocean ===
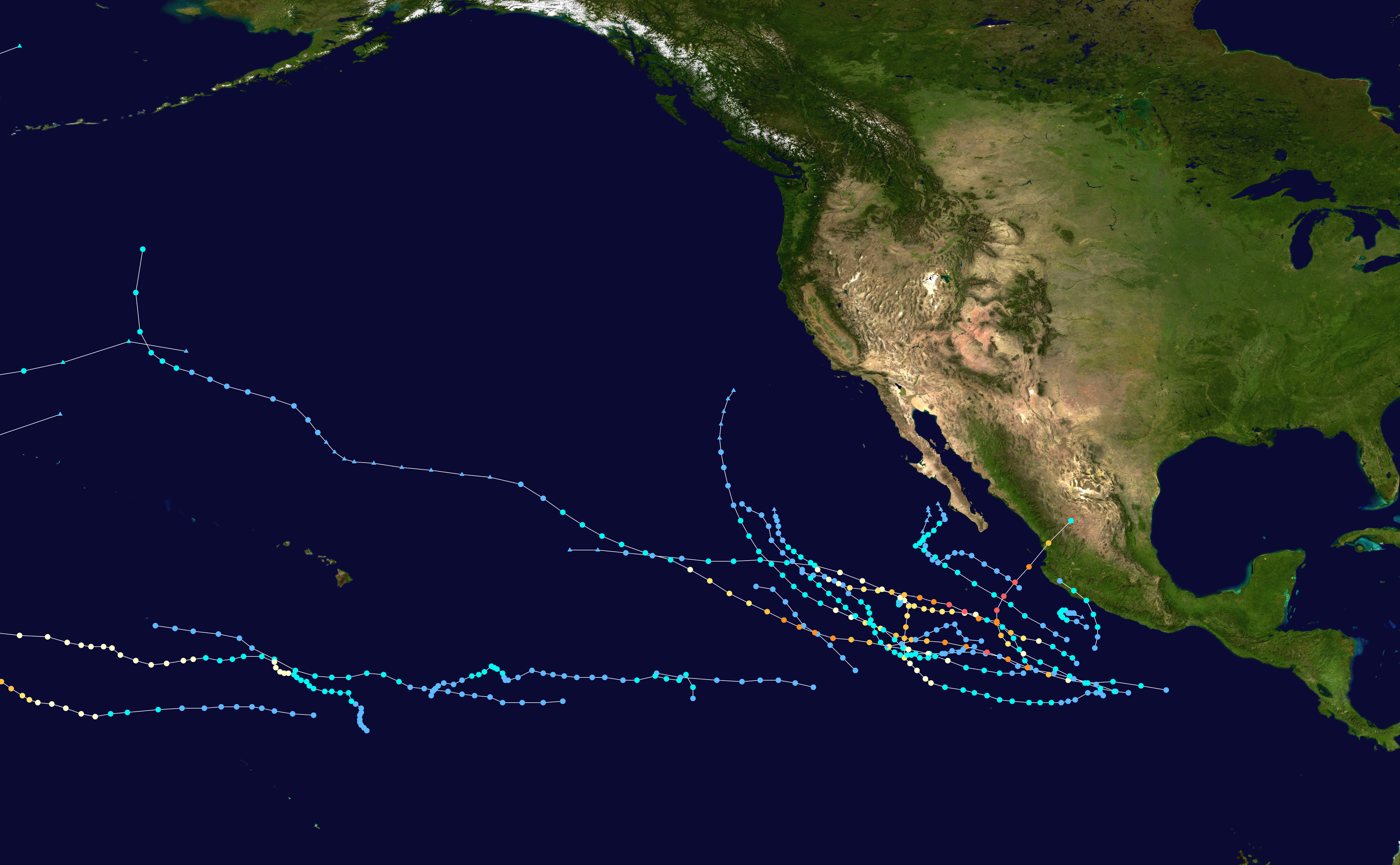
2002 Pacific hurricane season summary map

The season was slightly above average as it saw three tropical cyclones reach Category 5 intensity on the Saffir–Simpson scale, tied for the most in a season with 1994 and 2018. The strongest storm this year was Hurricane Kenna, which reached Category 5 on the Saffir–Simpson scale. It made landfall near Puerto Vallarta, located in the Mexican state of Jalisco, on October 25. Elsewhere, Tropical Storm Julio made landfall in Mexico, and Tropical Storm Boris dumped torrential rain along the Mexican coast, despite remaining offshore.

Other storms were individually unusual. Hurricanes Elida and Hernan also reached Category 5 intensity, but neither caused any damage. Hurricane Fausto had no effect on land, but it regenerated into a weak tropical storm at an abnormally high latitude.

=== Western Pacific Ocean ===
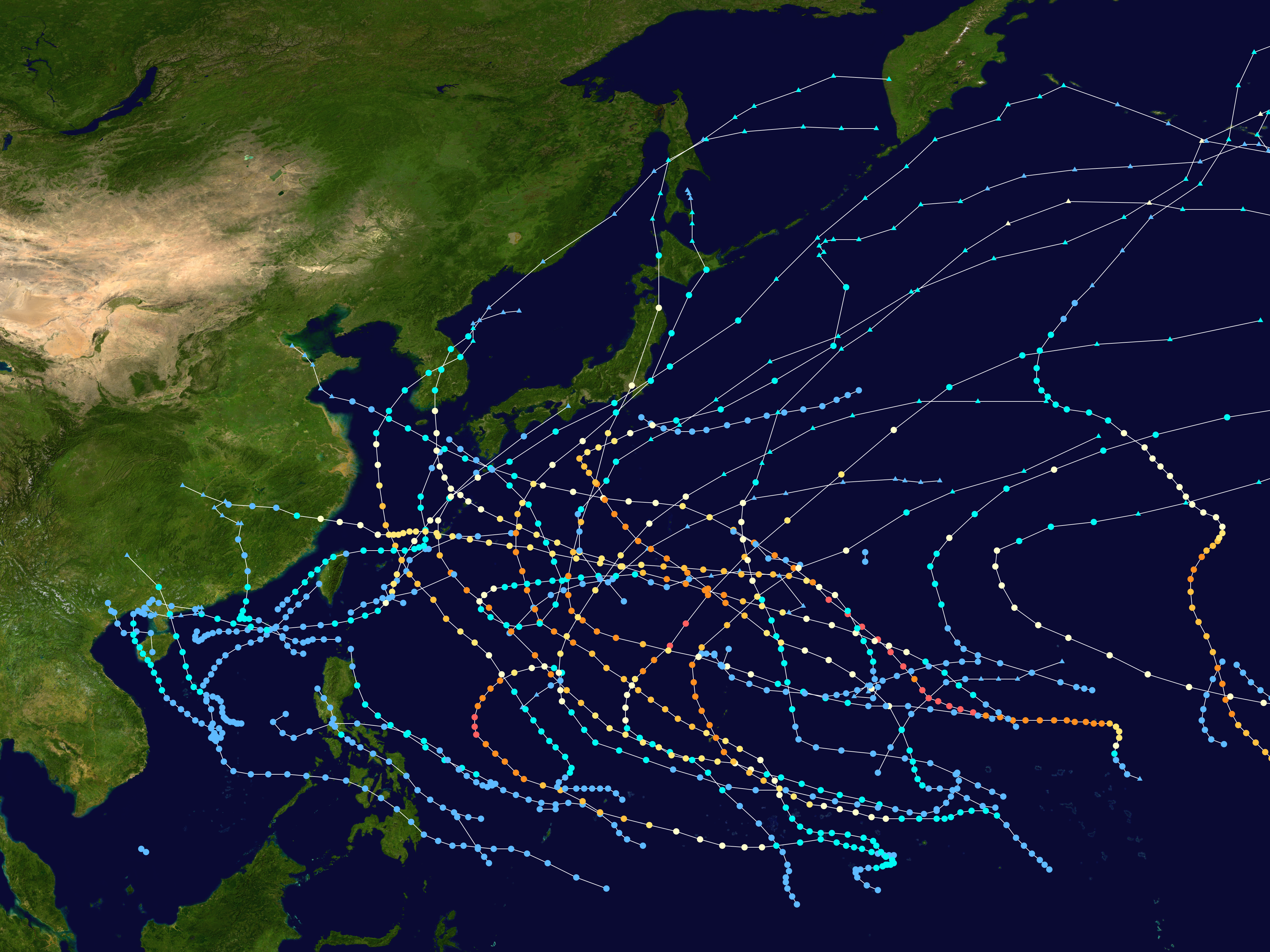
2002 Pacific typhoon season summary map

The season was slightly above average with many tropical cyclones affecting Japan and China. Every month had tropical activity, with most storms forming from July through October. Overall, there were 44 tropical depressions declared officially or unofficially, of which 26 became named storms; of those, there were 15 typhoons, which is the equivalent of a minimal hurricane, while 8 of the 15 typhoon intensified into super typhoons unofficially by the JTWC. The season began early with the first storm, Tapah, developing on January 10, east of the Philippines. Two months later, Typhoon Mitag became the first super typhoon (Note: A super typhoon is an unofficial category used by the Joint Typhoon Warning Center (JTWC) for a typhoon with winds of at least 240 km/h (150 mph).) ever to be recorded in March. In June, Typhoon Chataan dropped heavy rainfall in the Federated States of Micronesia, killing 48 people and becoming the deadliest natural disaster in the state of Chuuk. Chataan later left heavy damage in Guam before striking Japan. In August, Typhoon Rusa became the deadliest typhoon in South Korea in 43 years, causing 238 deaths and $4.2 billion in damage. (Note: All damage totals are valued as of 2002 and in United States dollars, unless otherwise noted.) Typhoon Higos in October was the fifth strongest typhoon to strike Tokyo since World War II. The final typhoon of the season was Typhoon Pongsona, which was one of the costliest storms on record in Guam; it did damage worth $700 million on the island before dissipating on December 11.

The season began early, but did not become active until June, when six storms passed near or over Japan after a ridge weakened. Nine storms developed in July, many of which influenced the monsoon trough over the Philippines to produce heavy rainfall and deadly flooding. The flooding was worst in Luzon, where 85 people were killed. The series of storms caused the widespread closure of schools and offices. Many roads were damaged, and the floods left about $1.8 million (₱94.2 million PHP) (Note: The total was originally reported in Philippine pesos. Total converted via the Oanda Corporation website.) in crop damage, largely to rice and corn. Overall damage from the series of storms was estimated at $10.3 million (₱522 million PHP). From June to September, heavy rainfall affected large portions of China, resulting in devastating flooding that killed over 1,500 people and left $8.2 billion (¥68 billion CNY) in damage. (Note: The total was originally reported in Chinese renminbi. Total converted via the Oanda Corporation website.) During this time, Tropical Storm Kammuri struck southern China with a large area of rainfall that damaged or destroyed 245,000 houses. There were 153 deaths related to the storm, mostly inland in Hunan, and damage totaled $322 million (¥2.665 billion CNY). Activity shifted farther to the east after September, with Typhoon Higos striking Japan in October and Typhoon Pongsona hitting Guam in December.

During most of the year, sea surface temperatures were above normal near the equator, and were highest around 160° E from January to July, and in November. Areas of convection developed farther east than usual, causing many storms to develop east of 150° E. The average point of formation was 145.9° E, the easternmost point since 1951. Partially as a result, no tropical storms made landfall in the Philippines for the first time since 1951, according to the JMA. Two storms – Ele and Huko – entered the basin from the Central Pacific, east of the International Date Line. Overall, there were 26 named storms in the basin in 2002, which was slightly below the norm of 26.7. A total of 15 of the 26 storms became typhoons, a slightly higher than normal proportion.

=== North Indian Ocean ===
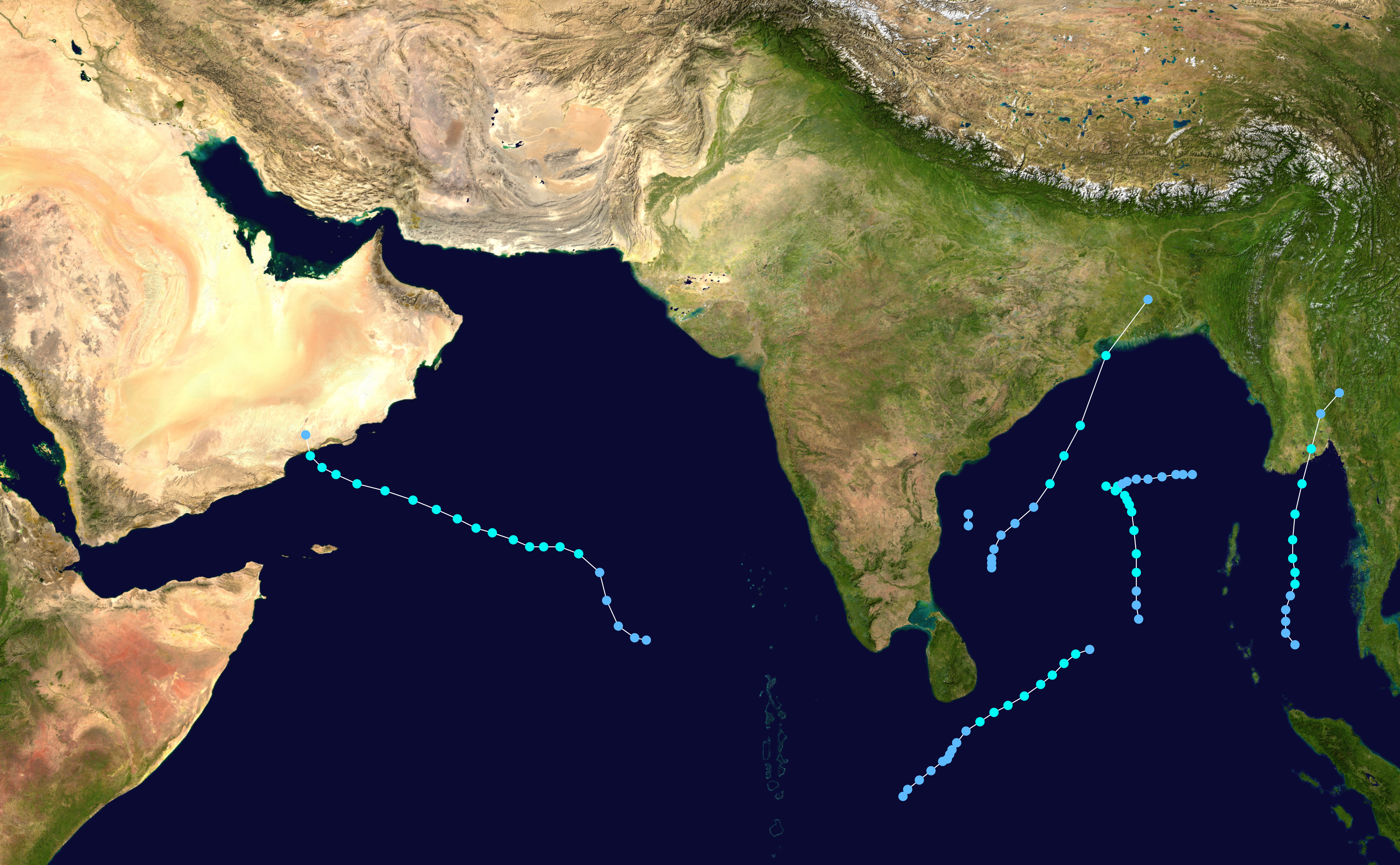
2002 North Indian Ocean cyclone season summary map

The season was below average, with only seven tropical cyclones, four cyclonic storms, and one severe cyclonic storm. The first storm, in the Arabian Sea, formed on May 6 from a low-pressure area. It went on to strengthen into a weak cyclonic storm, being designated ARB 01, and make landfall in Oman four days later, causing intense damage. ARB 01 simultaneously dissipated. The rest of May featured two tropical depressions. The first, according to the JTWC, reached tropical storm-equivalent strength and made landfall in Myanmar. The second was recognized only by the Thailand Meteorological Department and was not given a number. There was no activity in June, July, August, or September, the first instance of such in the history of the IMD. Then, on October 22, Depression BOB 02 formed. It did not intensify and dissipated two days later. No storms formed again until BOB 03 on November 10. This storm strengthened into a severe cyclonic storm, before making landfall in West Bengal two days later and dissipating. Like all the other storms in the season, BOB 03 failed to reach hurricane strength. Two more cyclonic storms formed in the Bay of Bengal. BOB 04 was in late November and did not affect land. BOB 05 formed very far south on December 21, scraped Sri Lanka, and dissipated in the open bay.

=== South Pacific Ocean ===
==== 2001–02 ====
2002 began with two storms active in the basin: Severe Tropical Cyclone Waka and Tropical Depression 05F. Waka, at the time, was a Category 4 severe tropical cyclone near Niue. Waka dissipated on January 2, and nothing formed but tropical depressions until Severe Tropical Cyclone Claudia entered the basin on February 12. Claudia rapidly weakened and dissipated two days later. The next tropical cyclone, Des, also crossed over, on March 5. Due to unfavorable conditions, Des soon dissipated. Following Des's dissipation, four official and one unofficial tropical depression formed. The season ended on April 22.

The 2001–02 season was one of the least active on record.

==== 2002–03 ====
The season began very early, starting with Tropical Depression 17F on July 3. After that, however, the season was quiet, with one tropical depression forming in mid October. By November, a tropical cyclone, Yolande had formed, as well as another tropical depression. In December, activity sped up, with Cyclone Zoe, a Category 5 severe tropical cyclone, forming.

With seven severe tropical cyclones in total, the 2002–03 season was one of the most active ever recorded.

=== Australian region ===
==== 2001–02 ====
On 1 January 2002, Tropical Cyclone Bernie had just formed near Northern Territory. Bernie made landfall in Northern Territory four days later, causing minor damages, and then dissipated. Then, on 2 February, Tropical Cyclone Chris formed. It rapidly intensified into a Category 5 severe tropical cyclone. On 6 February, Chris made landfall in Western Australia, and dissipated later in the day. Chris caused 12 deaths and some damage. Five days later, Tropical Cyclone Claudia formed, and dissipated without affecting land. After another tropical low, Tropical Cyclone Des formed on 4 March near Papua New Guinea. Three days later, Des crossed over to the South Pacific.

After Des, the season was quiet until a tropical cyclone was named Dianne on 7 April. Dianne passed close to the Cocos Islands, intensified into a Category 3 tropical cyclone, and moved westward into the South-West Indian Ocean on 11 April. Simultaneously with Dianne, Tropical Cyclone Bonnie was forming. On 11 April, Bonnie moved over Timor and Java and caused some damage, killing 19 people. In early May, Tropical Low Errol formed. On 26 May, Tropical Cyclone Upia, the season's last storm, formed near Papua New Guinea and was named by TCWC Port Moresby. It crossed Budibudi Island, east of Woodlark Island, and caused severe damage there. Once Upia dissipated on 28 May, the season was over.

The 2001–02 season was a near-normal tropical cyclone season.

==== 2002–03 ====
In 2002, this season was very inactive. According to the Joint Typhoon Warning Center, the first tropical cyclone of the year, Tropical Depression 07S formed on 27 December. It did not strengthen, and dissipated on 3 January 2003. It was not recognised by the BoM.

=== South-West Indian Ocean ===
==== 2001–02 ====
The 2001–02 South-West Indian Ocean cyclone season was very active from its start. The 2002 half of the season began with Tropical Storm Cyprien, which made landfall in western Madagascar and dissipated on 3 January. Two weeks later, Intense Tropical Cyclone Dina formed, causing record flooding in Mauritius and Reunion. Approximately fifteen people died in the storm. Towards the end of January, Tropical Cyclone Eddy formed, but dissipated on 30 January without affecting land. On the day that Eddy dissipated, a tropical low crossed into the basin and eventually became Intense Tropical Cyclone Francesca. Francesca moved southward, and in the open ocean, dissipated on 11 February. On 5 February, a tropical disturbance, classified as 09, formed in the Mozambique Channel, and dissipated the very next day.

In mid-February, a tropical depression formed over Madagascar. Moving east, it strengthened into Intense Tropical Cyclone Guillaume. On 18 February, Guillaume moved to the south and affected Mauritius. In the following days, Guillaume deteriorated due to wind shear, and dissipated on 23 February. On 5 March, Cyclone Hary formed. The most intense storm of the season, Hary made landfall in Madagascar, causing four fatalities. Later in March, Tropical Cyclone Ikala developed in the south-central Indian Ocean, moving south and dissipating without affecting land. On 9 April, Tropical Cyclone Dianne crossed over from the Australian region and was renamed Jery, becoming extratropical two days later without affecting land. The final storm of the season was Cyclone Kesiny, which became the first cyclone in the basin's history to make landfall in May when the storm struck Toamasina on 9 May, causing 33 deaths and upwards of 1,200 injuries.

==== 2002–03 ====
The 2002–03 season was one of the most active on record, lasting an unprecedented eight months. The season started off early, with an unnamed tropical storm forming in early September. The storm inflicted $50,000 damages on Seychelles, the most destruction caused by a tropical cyclone in 50 years, before dissipating on 8 September. In November, Tropical Depression Atang formed, nearly dissipating and reorganizing several times before making landfall in northern Mozambique on 12 November. There were no confirmed deaths caused by Atang. Days later, Tropical Cyclone Boura formed, moving west and dissipating two weeks later without affecting land. On 21 December, Tropical Storm Crystal formed. The storm moved to the south, passing near Mauritius without effect before dissipating on 29 December. The final storm in 2002, Severe Tropical Storm Delfina, made landfall in Mozambique on 31 December, causing 47 deaths.

== Systems ==
=== January ===
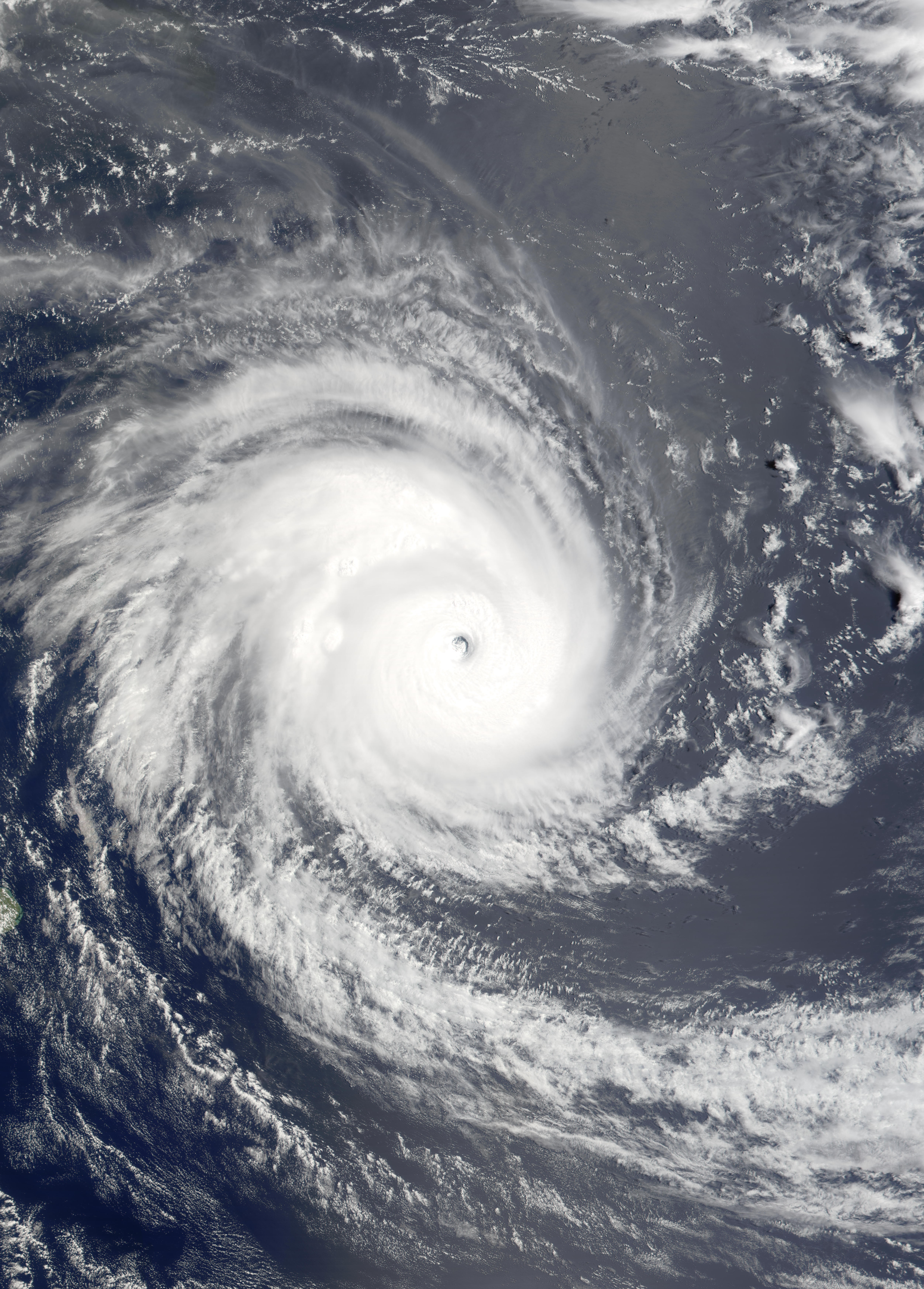
Cyclone Dina

In January, the Intertropical Convergence Zone (ITCZ), which allows for the formation of tropical waves, is located in the Southern Hemisphere, remaining there until May. This limits Northern Hemisphere cyclone formation to comparatively rare non-tropical sources. In addition, the month's climate is also an important factor. In the Southern Hemisphere basins, January, at the height of the austral summer, is the most active month by cumulative number of storms since records began. Of the four Northern Hemisphere basins, none is very active in January, as the month is during the winter, but the most active basin is the Western Pacific, which occasionally sees weak tropical storms form during the month.

In 2002, January saw six tropical cyclones form, of which four were named. This does not include the three tropical cyclones that were active when the year began: Tropical Cyclone Bernie in Australia, Tropical Storm Cyprien in Madagascar, and Tropical Depression 05F in the Solomon Islands. After these storms dissipated, Tropical Storm Tapah formed on 9 January, becoming the first Northern Hemisphere tropical cyclone in 2002. On 16 January, Cyclone Dina formed in the South-West Indian Ocean. Dina would become the only January cyclone to cause significant damage to land, inflicting $287 million in damages and fifteen fatalities in Réunion. The storm was also the most intense of the month, featuring a central pressure of 910 hPa (26.87 inHg).

Tropical cyclones formed in January 2002
Storm name	Dates active	Max wind km/h (mph)	Min pressure (hPa)	Areas affected	Damage (USD)	Deaths	Refs
Bernie	30 December 2001–6 January 2002	95 (60)	980	Northern Territory	Minimal	None	
Cyprien	30 December 2001–3 January 2002	100 (65)	980	Madagascar	Minimal	None	
05F	31 December 2001–6 January 2002	65 (40)	998	Solomon Islands	None	None	
Tapah (Agaton)	9–14 January	75 (45)	996	Philippines	Minimal	None	
06F	15–16 January	65 (40)	1000	New Caledonia	None	None	
Dina	16–25 January	215 (130)	910	Mauritius, Réunion	$287 million	15	
07F	20–27 January	65 (40)	997	Vanuatu, New Caledonia	Minimal	None	
Eddy	22–30 January	130 (80)	965	None	None	None	
Francesca	30 January – 11 February	195 (120)	925	None	None	None	

=== February ===
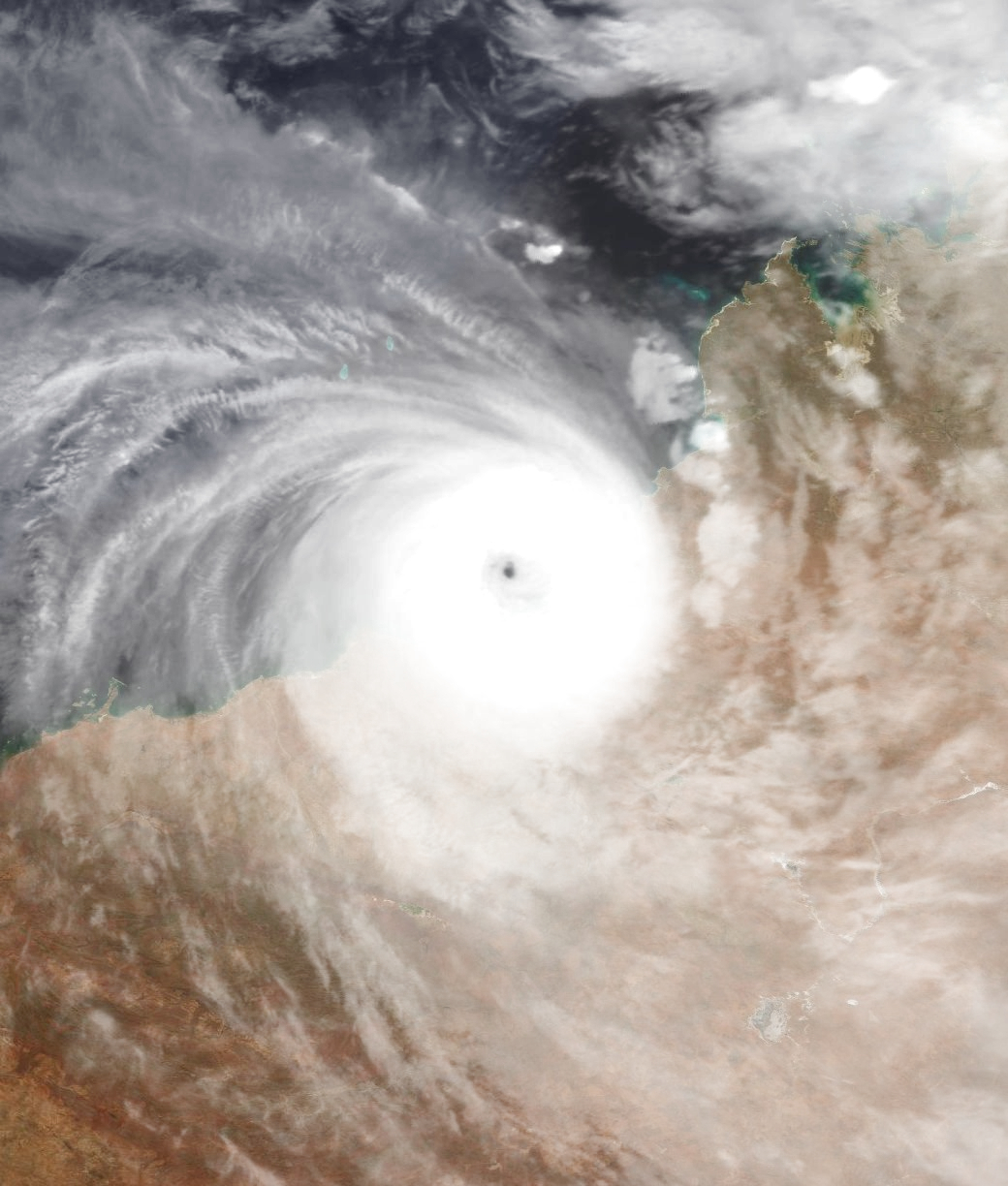
Cyclone Chris

In terms of activity, February is normally similar to January, with activity effectively restricted to the Southern Hemisphere excepting the rare Western Pacific storm. In fact, in the Southern Hemisphere, due to the monsoon being at its height, February tends to see more formation of strong tropical cyclones than January despite seeing marginally fewer overall storms. In the Northern Hemisphere, February is the least active month, with no Eastern or Central Pacific tropical cyclones and only one Atlantic tropical cyclone having ever formed in the month. Even in the Western Pacific, February activity is low: in 2002, the month had never seen any typhoon-strength storms, with the first being 2015's Typhoon Higos.

The month saw a high number of tropical cyclones – eleven – although most failed to develop past depression intensity, with only four being named. The first storm to form in February, Cyclone Chris, would also become the strongest, with a pressure of 920 hPa (27.17 inHg), and deadliest, causing twelve deaths, of the month. Chris made landfall in Western Australia, causing just short of $1 million in damage. It would become the only hurricane-strength cyclone to make landfall in Australia in 2002. The only other storm forming that month to cause significant damage to land was Typhoon Mitag, which formed on 26 February near the Caroline Islands. Mitag would intensify to become the first super typhoon ever in March, eventually causing $150 million in damage to Micronesia.

Tropical cyclones formed in February 2002
Storm name	Dates active	Max wind km/h (mph)	Min pressure (hPa)	Areas affected	Damage (USD)	Deaths	Refs
Chris	2–7 February	205 (125)	915	Indonesia, Western Australia	$929,000	12	
09	5–13 February	45 (30)	1005	None	None	None	
Monsoon Low	9–13 February	55 (35)	998	Northern Territory	Unknown	None	
Claudia	11–15 February	130 (80)	965	None	None	None	
Guillaume	14–23 February	205 (125)	920	Mauritius	Minimal	None	
TD	15 February	55 (35)	1006	None	None	None	
Monsoon Low	16–23 February	Unknown	Unknown	Western Australia, Northern Territory	Unknown	None	
09F	17–18 February	75 (45)	997	Fiji	None	None	
10F	23–26 February	65 (40)	1000	None	None	None	
11F	26–27 February	30 (15)	1002	None	None	None	
Mitag (Basyang)	26 February– 8 March	175 (110)	930	Micronesia	$150 million	2	

=== March ===
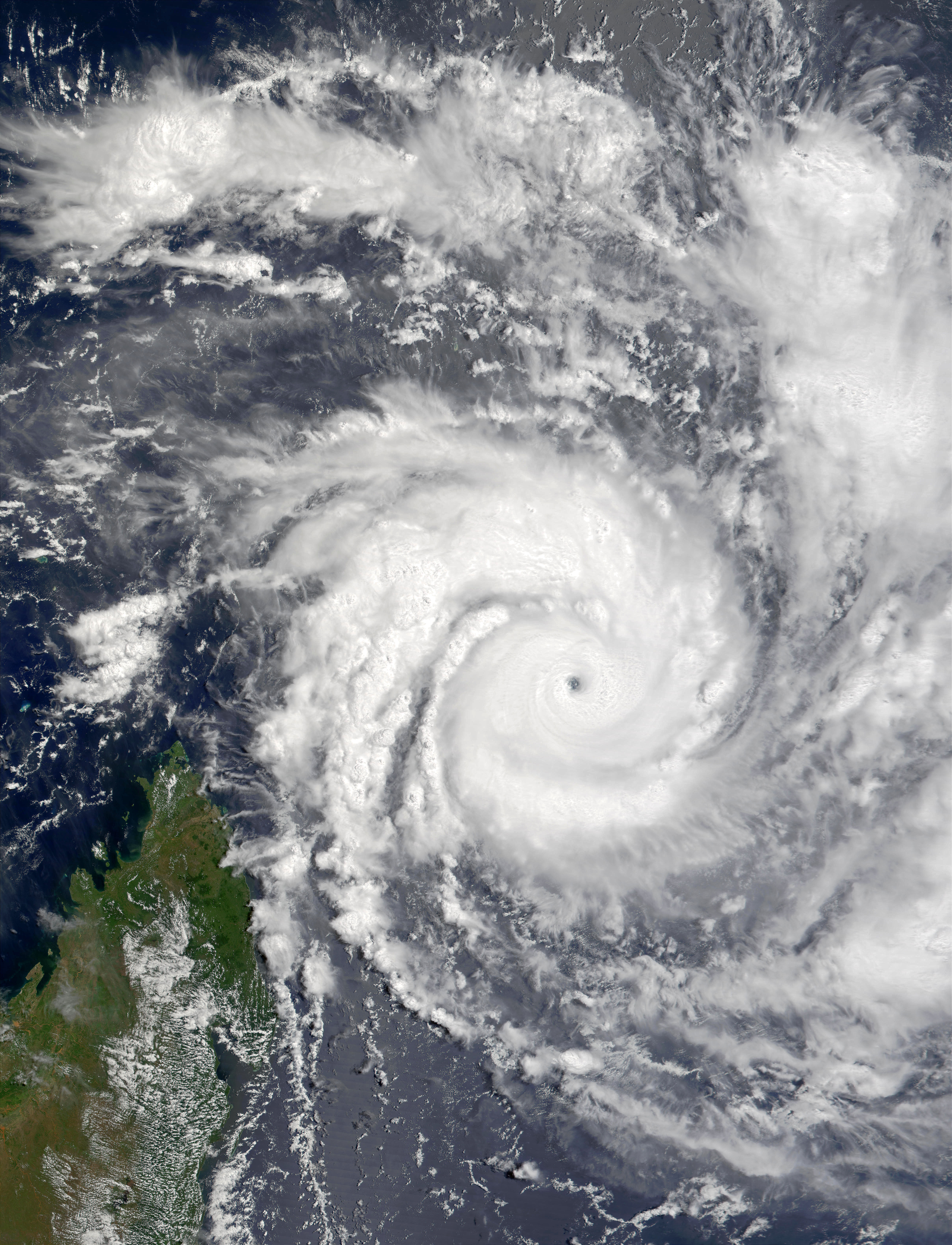
Cyclone Hary

During March, activity tends to be lower than in preceding months. In the Southern Hemisphere, the peak of the season has normally already passed, and the monsoon has begun to weaken, decreasing cyclonic activity, however, the month often sees more intense tropical cyclones than January or February. Meanwhile, in the Northern Hemisphere basins, sea surface temperatures are still far too low to normally support tropical cyclogenesis. The exception is the Western Pacific, which usually sees its first storm, often a weak depression, at some point between January and April.

In 2002, a total of six systems formed during March, of which three intensified into tropical storms. The most intense storm of the month was Cyclone Hary, which formed in the South-West Indian Ocean on 5 March. It intensified to attain a pressure of 905 hPa (26.72 inHg), making Hary the most intense storm thus far in the year, before making landfall in Madagascar, causing four deaths. The only other storm to affect land that month was Tropical Depression 03W, which made landfall in the Philippines, causing $2.4 million in damage and 35 deaths.

Tropical cyclones formed in March 2002
Storm name	Dates active	Max wind km/h (mph)	Min pressure (hPa)	Areas affected	Damage (USD)	Deaths	Refs
Des	3–4 March	95 (60)	985	New Caledonia	None	None	
Hary	5–13 March	220 (140)	905	Madagascar, Mauritius, Réunion	Unknown	4	
13F	13–16 March	65 (40)	1000	None	None	None	
14F	20–23 March	65 (40)	1002	None	None	None	
03W (Caloy)	21–23 March	55 (35)	1004	Philippines	$2.4 million	35	
Ikala	21–29 March	165 (105)	945	None	None	None	

=== April ===
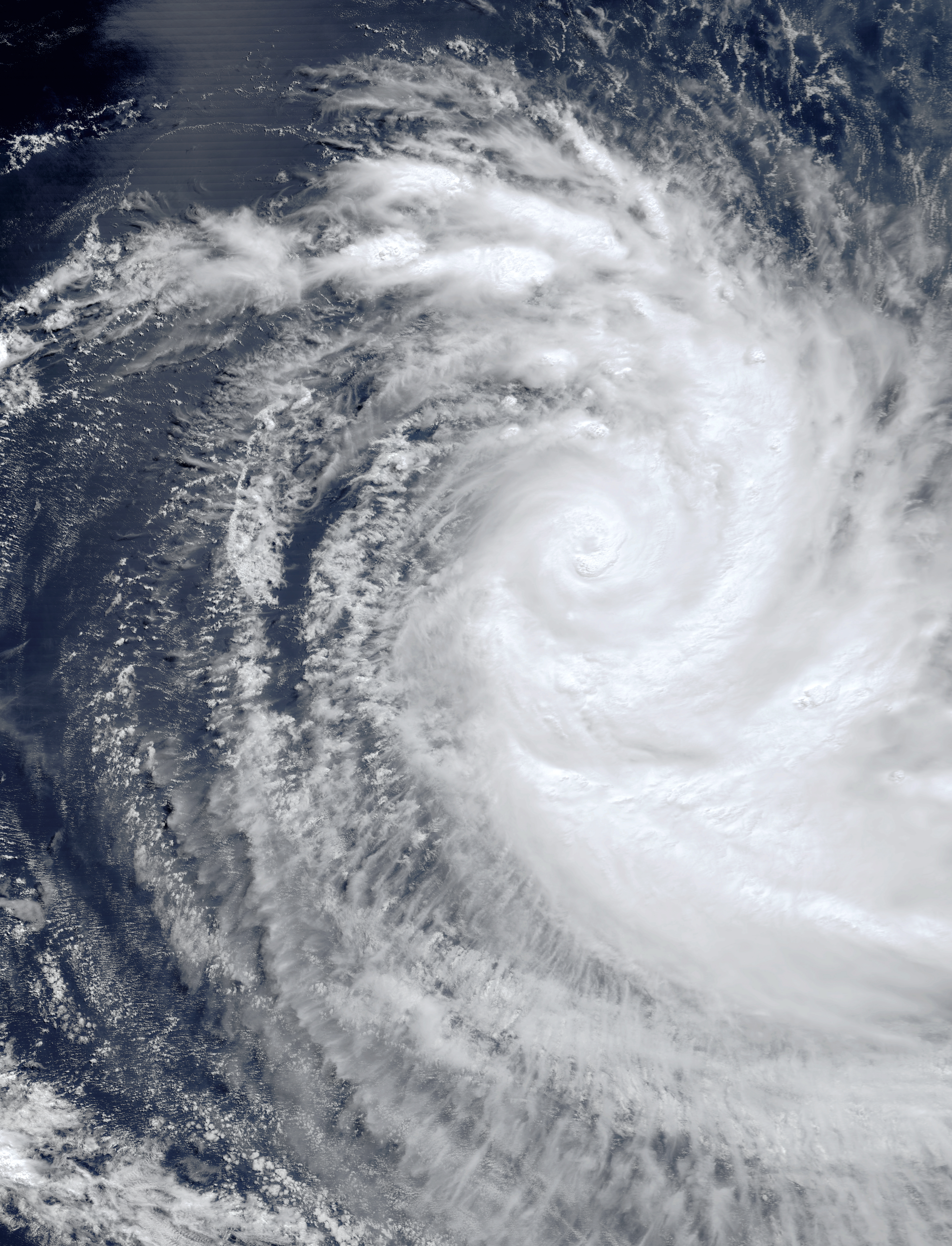
Cyclone Dianne–Jery

The factors that begin to inhibit Southern Hemisphere cyclone formation in March are even more pronounced in April, with the average number of storms formed being hardly half that of March. However, even this limited activity exceeds the activity in the Northern Hemisphere, which is rare, with the exception of the Western Pacific basin. All Pacific typhoon seasons between 1998 and 2016 saw activity between January and April, although many of these seasons saw only weak tropical depressions. By contrast, only two Atlantic hurricane seasons during those years saw tropical cyclone formation during that period. With the combination of the decreasing temperatures in the Southern Hemisphere and the still-low temperatures in the Northern Hemisphere, April and May tend to be the least active months worldwide for tropical cyclone formation.

April 2002 was an example of this phenomenon, with only five tropical cyclones forming, and only two becoming tropical storms, making the month the least active of 2002. Of those two storms, the stronger was Tropical Cyclone Dianne–Jery, which formed in the Australian region on 7 April and crossed over to the South-West Indian Ocean before dissipating on 11 April. No storms in April caused any known damage to land.

Tropical cyclones formed in April 2002
Storm name	Dates active	Max wind km/h (mph)	Min pressure (hPa)	Areas affected	Damage (USD)	Deaths	Refs
15F	1–2 April	Unknown	1002	None	None	None	
04W	6–8 April	55 (35)	1004	None	None	None	
Dianne–Jery	7–11 April	150 (90)	955	None	None	None	
Bonnie	9–14 April	95 (60)	985	Indonesia	None	None	
16F	17–22 April	Unknown	1002	None	None	None	

=== May ===
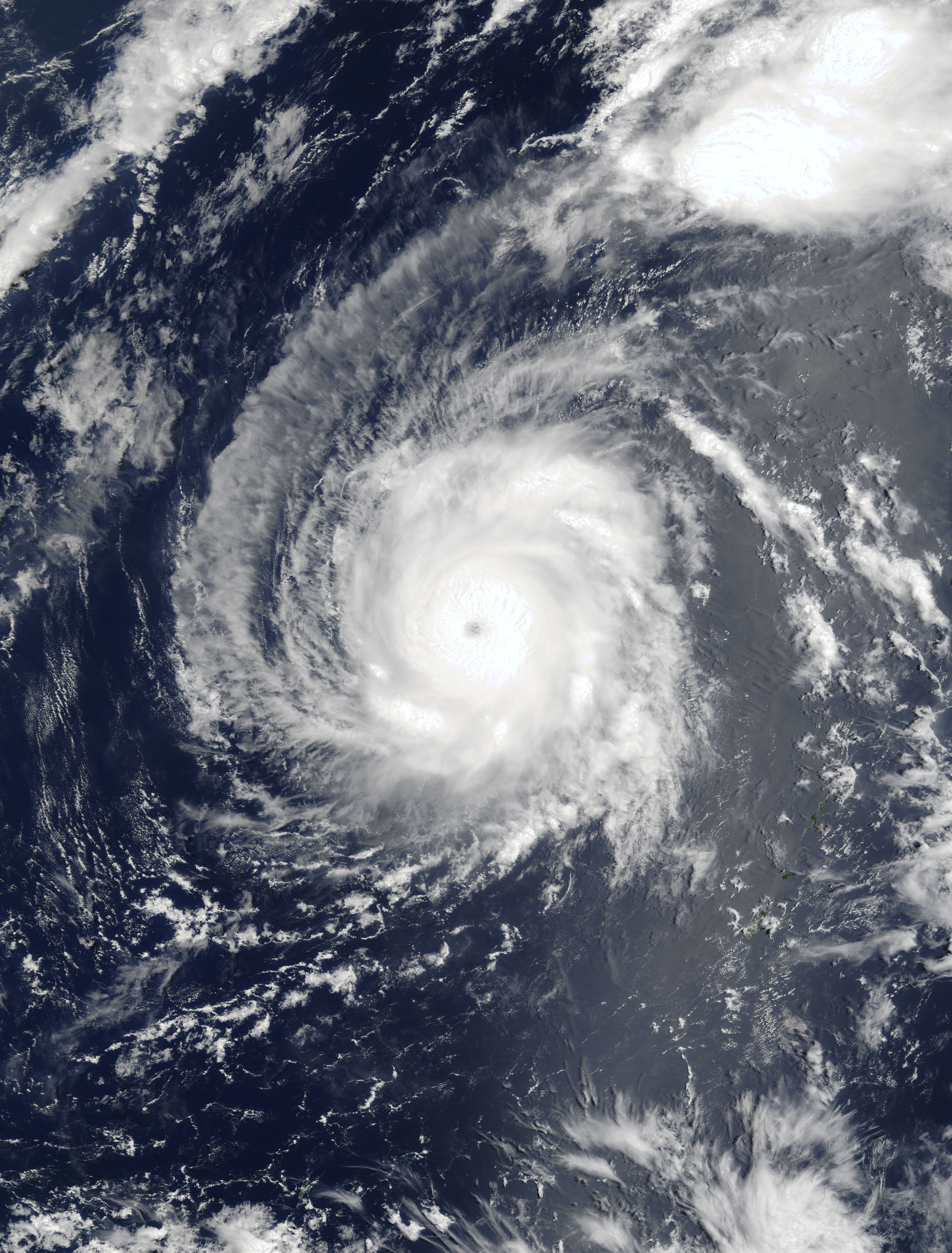
Typhoon Hagibis

Around the middle of May, the Intertropical Convergence Zone (ITCZ), which allows for the formation of tropical waves and has previously remained in the Southern Hemisphere for the first five months of the year, moves to the Northern Hemisphere, allowing the northern cyclone seasons to start in earnest. Without the presence of the ITCZ, Southern Hemisphere cyclones must form from non-wave sources, which are rarer. For that reason, cyclone formation is relatively sparse, with May tending to be the month of the final storm in each of the three basins. Meanwhile, more intense storms are nearly unheard of, with the South-West Indian Ocean having seen only one intense tropical cyclone and no very intense tropical cyclones in the month, and the other two basins having similarly low levels of activity in May. In the Northern Hemisphere, May is the first month most basins see activity, due to the new presence of the ITCZ. The Pacific hurricane season begins on May 15, and although the Atlantic hurricane season officially begins on June 1, off-season storms are very common, with over half of the 21st century seasons seeing a storm form in May. Although the North Indian Ocean has no official start or end date, due to the monsoon, mid-May is the beginning of a month-long period of high activity in the basin. Even in the Western Pacific, activity tends to increase throughout May.

In 2002, May was significantly more active, with ten storms forming, of which five were named. The most intense storm of the month was Typhoon Hagibis, which was the second super typhoon of the season. It formed near the Caroline Islands on 15 May and moved north, reaching a central pressure of 935 hPa (27.61 inHg), although failed to significantly affect land due to a track far to the east. The costliest May storm was a storm in the North Indian Ocean which formed in the Arabian Sea on 6 June. The storm made landfall in the Dhofar Governorate of western Oman, causing $25 million in damage due to the worst flooding in 30 years. The deadliest was Cyclone Kesiny in the South-West Indian Ocean, which formed on 2 May. Kesiny made a disastrous landfall near Toamasina, in the north of Madagascar, on 9 May, becoming the first-ever South-West Indian Ocean tropical cyclone to make landfall in the month of May. The storm caused 33 deaths and over 1,200 injuries in Madagascar.

Tropical cyclones formed in May 2002
Storm name	Dates active	Max wind km/h (mph)	Min pressure (hPa)	Areas affected	Damage (USD)	Deaths	Refs
Kesiny	2–11 May	140 (80)	965	Madagascar	Unknown	33	
ARB 01	6–10 May	65 (40)	996	Yemen, Oman	$25 million	9	
Errol	9–15 May	65 (40)	995	None	None	None	
BOB 01	10–12 May	55 (35)	991	None	None	None	
Hagibis	15–21 May	175 (110)	935	Caroline Islands, Mariana Islands	None	None	
Unnumbered	17–19 May	55 (35)	995	None	None	None	
Alma	24 May – 1 June	185 (115)	960	None	None	None	
Upia	26–29 May	75 (45)	990	Budibudi Island, Papua New Guinea	None	None	
06W (Dagul)	26–30 May	55 (35)	1002	Philippines, Taiwan	None	None	
TD	27–29 May	Unknown	1008	None	None	None	

=== June ===
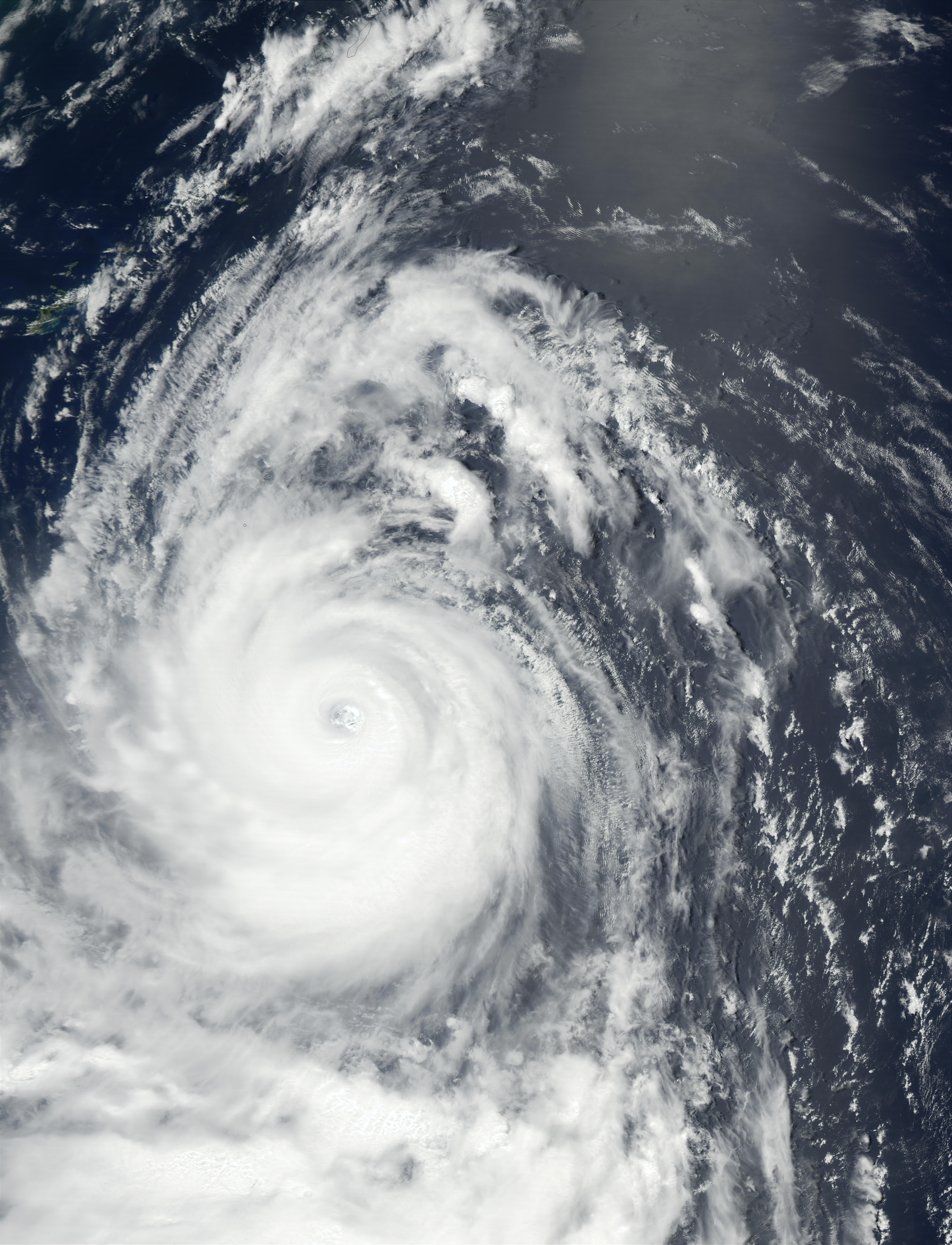
Typhoon Chataan

Tropical cyclones formed in June 2002
Storm name	Dates active	Max wind km/h (mph)	Min pressure (hPa)	Areas affected	Damage (USD)	Deaths	Refs
TD	3–5 June	Unknown	1004	Ryukyu Islands	None	None	
Noguri (Espada)	4–7 June	100 (65)	980	China	$500 million	153	
Boris	8–11 June	95 (60)	997	Southwestern Mexico	Minimal	None	
15	13–15 June	45 (30)	1000	None	None	None	
Three-E	27–29 June	55 (35)	1006	None	None	None	
Rammasun (Florita)	28 June – 1 July	155 (100)	945	China, Korean Peninsula, Ryukyu Islands, Taiwan	$100 million	97	
Chataan (Gloria)	28 June – 11 July	175 (110)	930	Chuuk, Guam, Japan	$660 million	54	

=== July ===
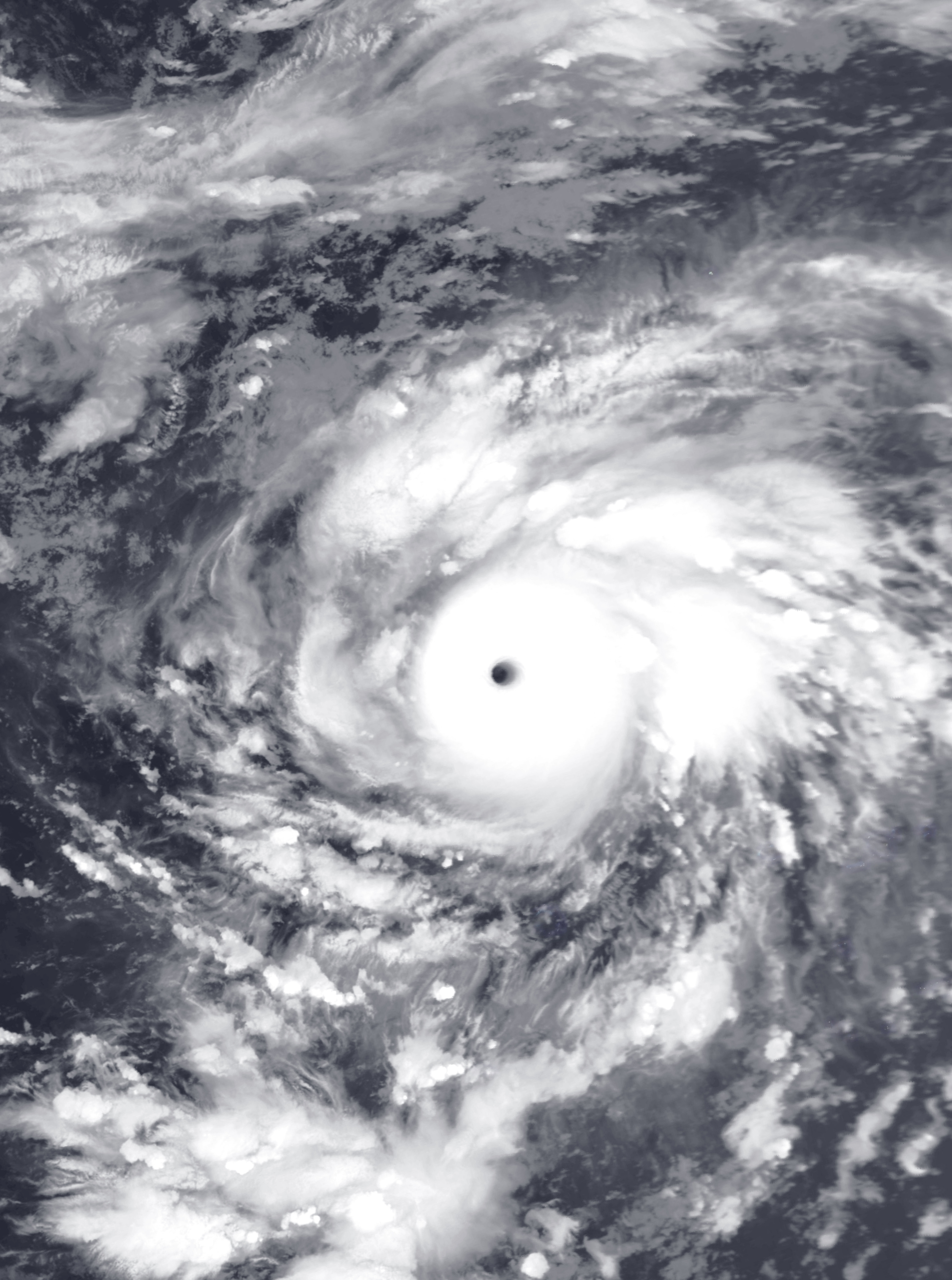
Typhoon Fengshen

Tropical cyclones formed in July 2002
Storm name	Dates active	Max wind km/h (mph)	Min pressure (hPa)	Areas affected	Damage (USD)	Deaths	Refs
17F	3–5 July	45 (30)	999	None	None	None	
Halong (Inday)	6–16 July	155 (100)	945	Guam, Philippines, Japan	$89.8 million	10	
Nakri (Hambalos)	7–13 July	95 (60)	983	Philippines, China, Taiwan, Japan	None	2	
Cristina	9–16 July	100 (65)	994	None	None	None	
Fengshen	13–28 July	185 (115)	920	Japan, China	$4 million	5	
Arthur	14–16 July	95 (60)	997	Southeastern United States	Minimal	1	
13W (Juan)	18–23 July	55 (35)	1002	Philippines	$240 thousand	14	
Fung-wong (Kaka)	18–27 July	130 (80)	960	Japan	None	None	
Douglas	20–26 July	165 (105)	970	None	None	None	
Kalmaegi	20–21 July	65 (40)	1003	None	None	None	
Elida	23–30 July	260 (160)	921	None	None	None	
TD	25–26 July	Unknown	1004	None	None	None	
TD	29–30 July	Unknown	998	South China	None	None	

=== August ===
Hurricane Hernan

Tropical cyclones formed in August 2002
Storm name	Dates active	Max wind km/h (mph)	Min pressure (hPa)	Areas affected	Damage (USD)	Deaths	Refs
Kammuri (Lagalag)	2–7 August	100 (65)	980	China	$509 million	153	
Bertha	4–9 August	65 (40)	1007	Mississippi	$200 thousand	1	
17W	5–6 August	55 (35)	998	None	None	None	
Cristobal	5–8 August	85 (50)	999	Bermuda, New York	Minimal	3	
Seven-E	6–8 August	55 (35)	1008	None	None	None	
18W (Milenyo)	11–14 August	55 (35)	998	Philippines	$3.3 million	35	
Phanfone	11–20 August	155 (100)	940	Japan	None	None	
Vongfong	15–20 August	75 (45)	985	China	$86 million	9	
Fausto	21 August – 3 September	230 (145)	936	Aleutian Islands, British Columbia	None	None	
Alika	22–28 August	100 (65)	995	None	None	None	
Rusa	22 August – 1 September	150 (90)	950	Japan, South Korea, North Korea	$4.2 billion	238	
Genevieve	26 August – 1 September	110 (70)	989	None	None	None	
Sinlaku	27 August – 9 September	150 (90)	950	Japan, China	$723 million	30	
Ele	27 August – 10 September	205 (125)	945	Johnston Atoll, Wake Island	None	None	
Dolly	29 August – 4 September	95 (60)	997	None	None	None	
Hernan	30 August – 6 September	260 (160)	921	Southwestern Mexico, Revillagigedo Islands, Socorro Island, Southwestern United States	None	None	

=== September ===
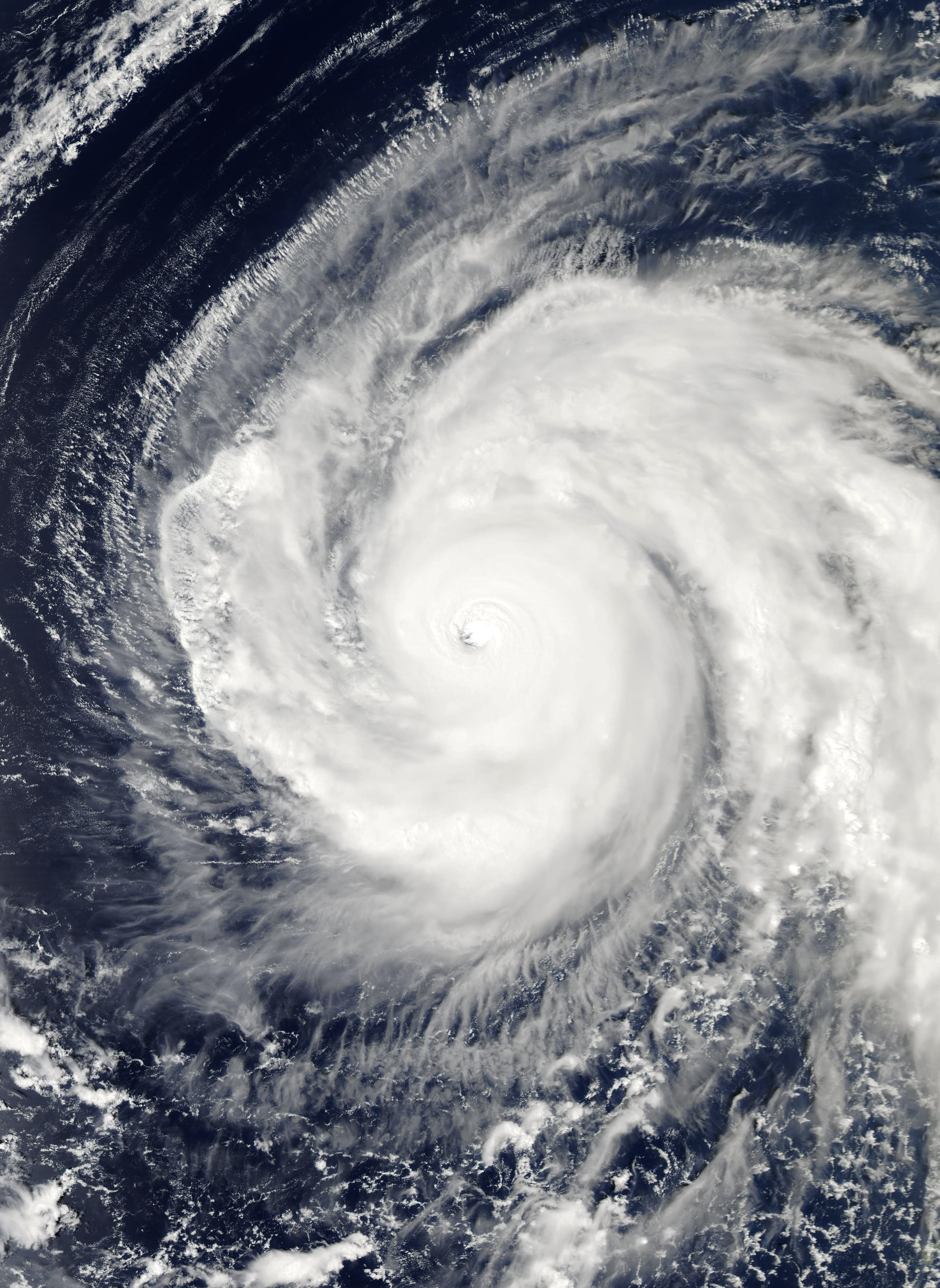
Typhoon Higos

Tropical cyclones formed in September 2002
Storm name	Dates active	Max wind km/h (mph)	Min pressure (hPa)	Areas affected	Damage (USD)	Deaths	Refs
Edouard	1–6 September	100 (65)	1002	Florida	Minimal	None	
Fay	5–8 September	95 (60)	998	Texas, Mexico	$4.5 million	None	
01	5–8 September	65 (40)	1003	Seychelles	$50 thousand	None	
Eleven-E	5–8 September	55 (35)	1006	Baja California Peninsula	Minimal	None	
Seven	7–8 September	55 (35)	1013	None	None	None	
Gustav	8–12 September	155 (100)	960	North Carolina, Virginia, New Jersey, New England	$340 thousand	4	
Hagupit	9–15 September	85 (50)	990	China	$32.5 million	25	
Hanna	12–15 September	95 (60)	1001	Florida, Louisiana, Alabama, Mississippi, Georgia, Southeastern U.S., Mid-Atlantic states	$20 million	3	
Isidore	14–27 September	205 (125)	934	Venezuela, Jamaica, Cayman Islands, Cuba, Yucatán Peninsula, Louisiana, Mississippi	$1.28 billion	22	
Iselle	15–20 September	110 (70)	990	Baja California Peninsula	Minimal	None	
Josephine	17–19 September	65 (40)	1006	None	None	None	
TD	18–19 September	Unknown	1002	Mariana Islands	None	None	
Kyle	20 September – 12 October	140 (85)	980	Bermuda, Florida, Georgia, South Carolina, North Carolina, British Isles	$5 million	1	
Lili	21 September – 4 October	230 (145)	938	Windward Islands, Haiti, Cuba, Cayman Islands, Louisiana	$1.16 billion	15	
TD	21–22 September	Unknown	1008	None	None	None	
Mekkhala	22–28 September	85 (50)	990	China	$103 million	None	
Julio	25–26 September	75 (45)	1000	Southwestern Mexico	Minimal	3	
Higos	26 September – 2 October	175 (110)	930	Japan, Primorsky Krai	$2.14 billion	12	

=== October ===
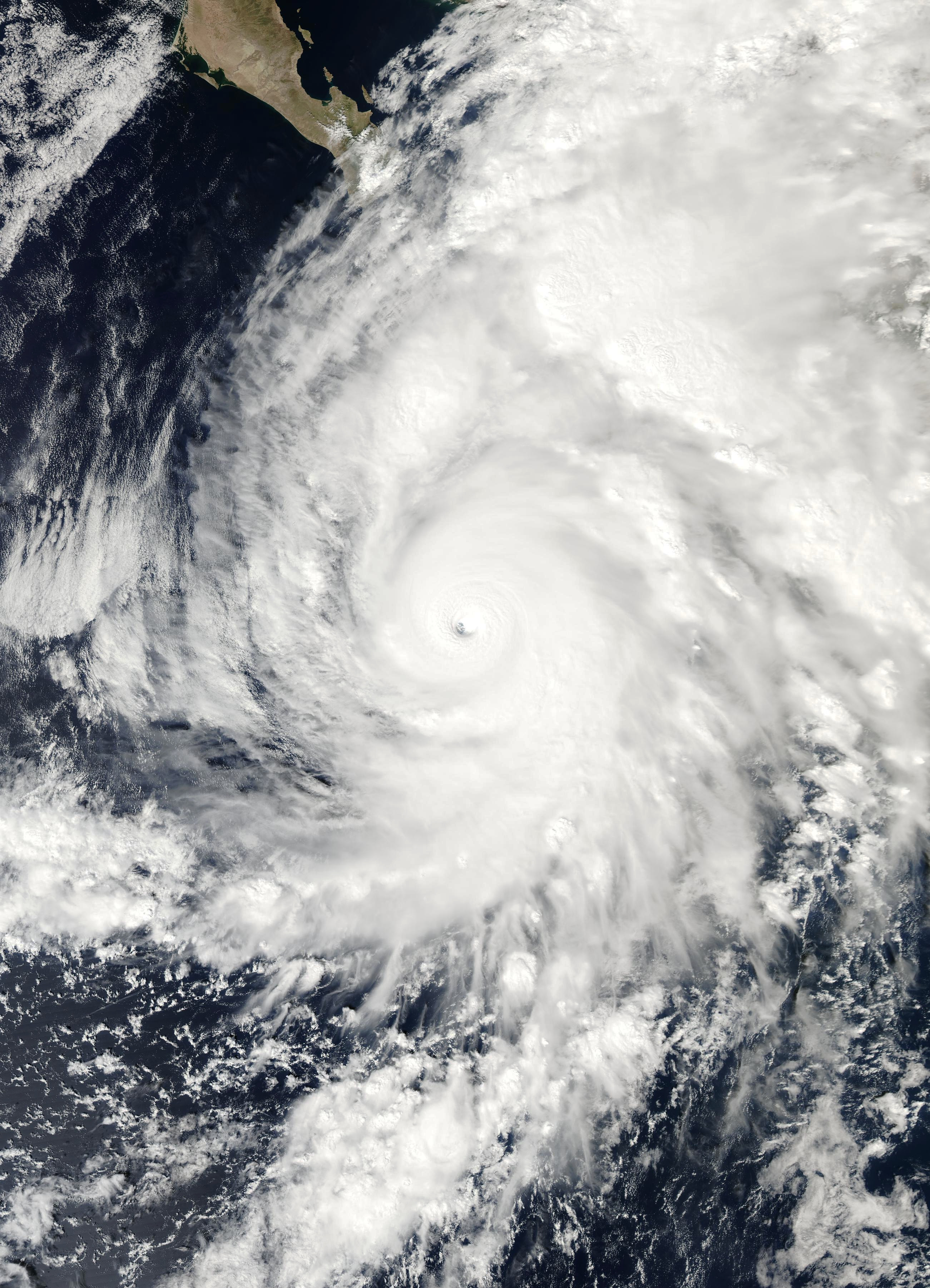
Hurricane Kenna

Tropical cyclones formed in October 2002
Storm name	Dates active	Max wind km/h (mph)	Min pressure (hPa)	Areas affected	Damage (USD)	Deaths	Refs
Bavi	8–13 October	100 (65)	985	None	None	None	
TD	12 October	Unknown	1004	None	None	None	
Fourteen	14–16 October	55 (35)	1002	Jamaica, Cayman Islands, Cuba	Minimal	None	
27W	15–18 October	55 (35)	1004	None	None	None	
28W	18–19 October	55 (35)	1008	None	None	None	
01F	21–22 October	45 (30)	1002	None	None	None	
Kenna	22–26 October	270 (165)	913	Southwestern Mexico, Western Mexico, Southern United States, Revillagigedo Islands, Socorro Island, Texas	$101 million	4	
BOB 02	22–25 October	45 (30)	1003	None	None	None	
Lowell	22–31 October	85 (50)	1002	Hawaii	None	None	
TD	23–24 October	Unknown	1010	Taiwan	None	None	
Huko	24 October – 7 November	140 (85)	985	None	None	None	
Maysak	26–31 October	100 (65)	980	None	None	None	

=== November ===
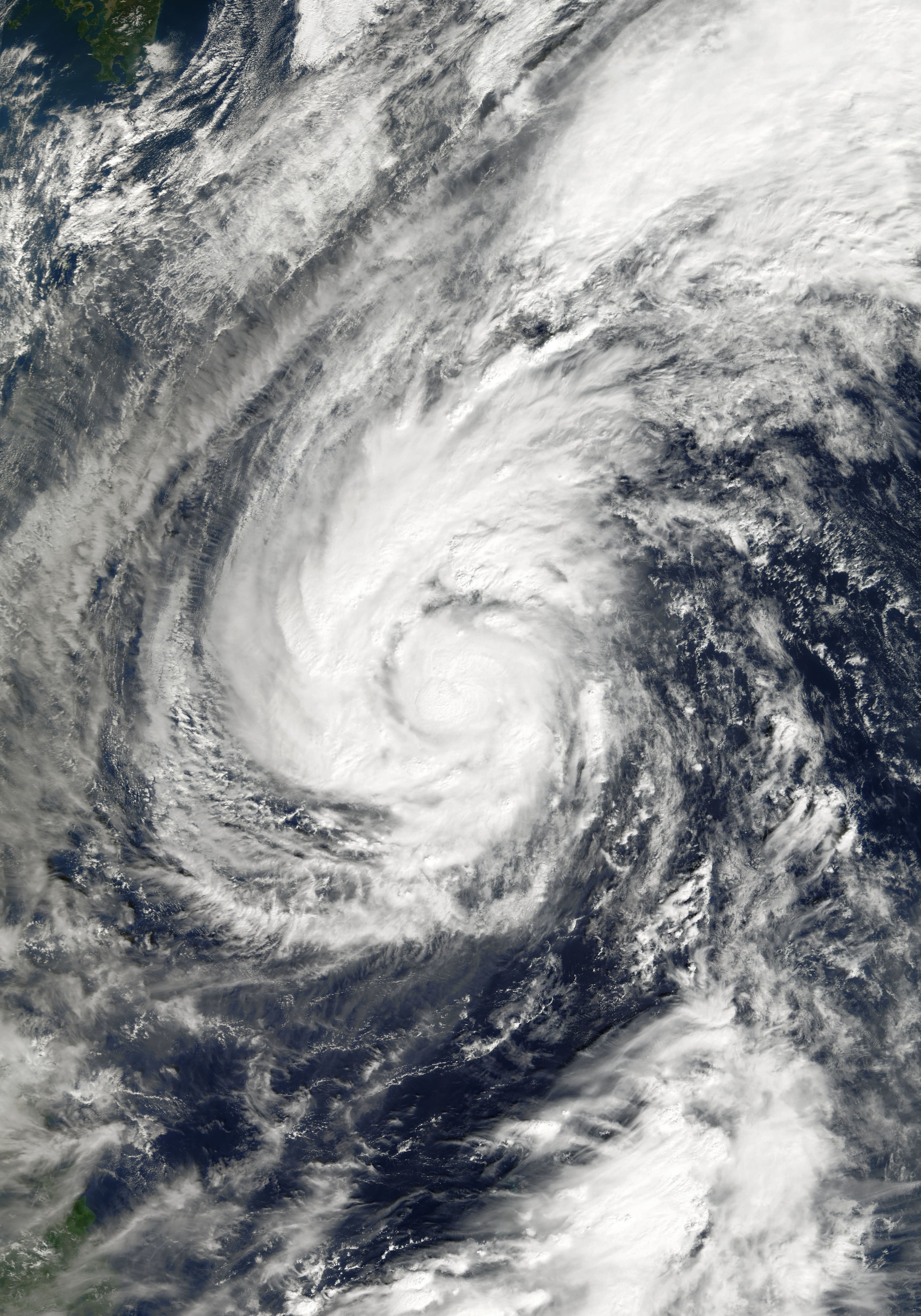
Typhoon Haishen

Tropical cyclones formed in November 2002
Storm name	Dates active	Max wind km/h (mph)	Min pressure (hPa)	Areas affected	Damage (USD)	Deaths	Refs
Atang	4–13 November	55 (35)	997	Madagascar, Mozambique, Tanzania	None	None	
BOB 03	10–12 November	100 (65)	984	Bangladesh, India	None	173	
Sixteen-E	14–16 November	55 (35)	1006	None	None	None	
Boura	14–27 November	130 (80)	965	None	None	None	
Haishen	20–25 November	155 (100)	955	None	None	None	
BOB 04	23–28 November	85 (50)	991	None	None	None	
TD	27 November	Unknown	1008	None	None	None	
Yolande	29 November – 6 December	65 (40)	995	Tonga	None	None	

=== December ===
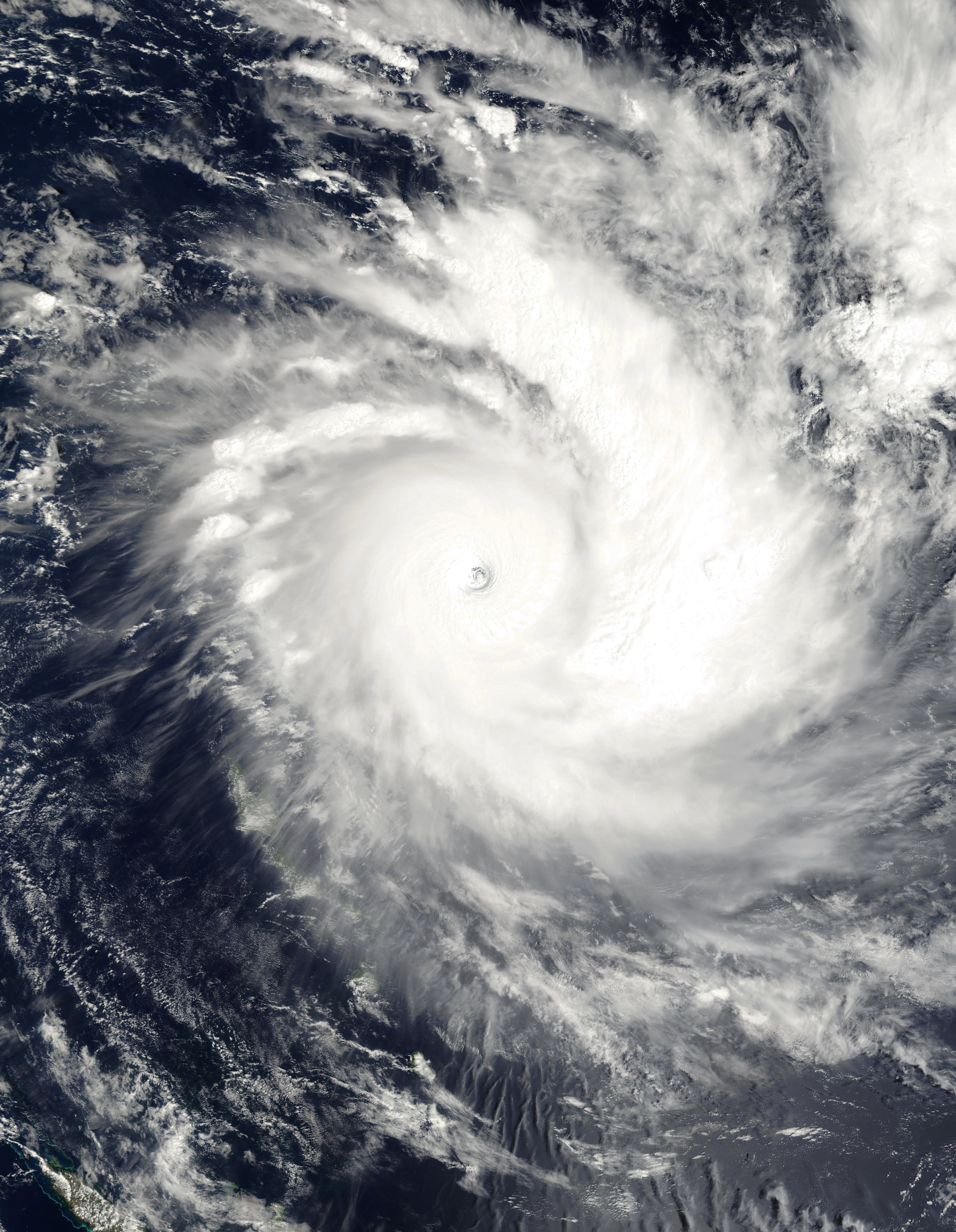
Cyclone Zoe

Tropical cyclones formed in December 2002
Storm name	Dates active	Max wind km/h (mph)	Pressure (hPa)	Areas affected	Damage (USD)	Deaths	Refs
Pongsona	2–11 December	165 (105)	940	Guam, Northern Mariana Islands	$730 million	1	
03F	10–13 December	55 (35)	1002	None	None	None	
Crystal	21–29 December	150 (90)	955	Mauritius	Minimal	None	
BOB 05	21–25 December	65 (40)	997	None	None	None	
Zoe	23 December 2002–4 January 2003	240 (150)	890	Solomon Islands, Vanuatu, Fiji	Severe	None	
Delfina	30 December 2002–9 January 2003	95 (60)	984	Mozambique, Malawi	$3.5 million	54	

== Global effects ==
Season name		Areas affected	Systems formed	Named storms	Hurricane-force tropical cyclones	Damage (2002 USD)	Deaths	Ref
North Atlantic Ocean (Note: The wind speeds for this tropical cyclone/basin are based on the Saffir Simpson Scale which uses 1-minute sustained winds.)		Yucatán Peninsula, Cayman Islands, Cuba, United States, Canada, Lesser Antilles, Hispaniola, Puerto Rico, The Bahamas, Bermuda, Iceland, Ireland, United Kingdom, Hispaniola, West Africa, Cape Verde, Azores	14	12	4	$2.47 billion	50	
Eastern and Central Pacific Ocean		Mexico, Baja California Sur, Southwestern United States, Colima, Sonora, Nayarit	19	15	8	$101.02 million	4 (3) (Note: The number in the bracket indicates indirect deaths.)	
Western Pacific Ocean (Note: Only systems that formed either before or on December 31, 2002 are counted in the seasonal totals.)		Micronesia, Taiwan, Philippines, China, Vietnam, Mariana Islands, Japan, Korean Peninsula, Laos, Russian Far East, Thailand, Myanmar, Alaska	41	24	16 (Note: According to the JMA, Hurricanes Ele and Huko entered the West Pacific Basin and became Typhoons Ele and Huko between August 30 and November 3)	$9.54 billion	725	
North Indian Ocean (Note: The wind speeds for this tropical cyclone/basin are based on the IMD Scale which uses 3-minute sustained winds.)		India, Bangladesh, Myanmar, Maldives, Sri Lanka, Yemen, Oman, Saudi Arabia, Somalia, Djibouti, Eritrea	7	4	0	$25 million	182	
South-West Indian Ocean	January – June (Note: Only systems that formed either on or after January 1, 2002 are counted in the seasonal totals.) (Note: The wind speeds for this tropical cyclone are based on Météo-France, which uses wind gusts.)	Madagascar, Comoros, Mauritius, Réunion	10	8	7	$287.2 million	52	
South-West Indian Ocean	July – December	Seychelles, Madagascar, Mozambique, Tanzania, Malawi	5	4	2	$4 million	52	
Australian region	January – June	Indonesia, Australia, Solomon Islands, Papua New Guinea	10	8	3	$929,000	None	
Australian region	July – December	—N/a	—N/a	—N/a	—N/a	—N/a	—N/a	—N/a
South Pacific Ocean	January – June	Fiji, New Caledonia, Vanuatu, Tonga, New Zealand, Wallis and Futuna, Niue, Solomon Islands	10	1	0	None	None	
South Pacific Ocean	July – December	Fiji, New Caledonia, Vanuatu, Tonga, New Zealand, Samoan Islands, Wallis and Futuna, Niue, Solomon Islands	5	2	1	—N/a	—N/a	
Worldwide		(See above)	121 (Note: The sum of the number of systems in each basin will not equal the number shown as the total. This is because when systems move between basins, it creates a discrepancy in the actual number of systems.)	78	41	$12.42 billion	1,065 (3)	

== See also ==
- List of earthquakes in 2002
- Tornadoes of 2002
- Weather of 2002
