= Tropical Storm Cyprien =

South-West Indian tropical storm in 2001 and 2002

Severe Tropical Storm Cyprien
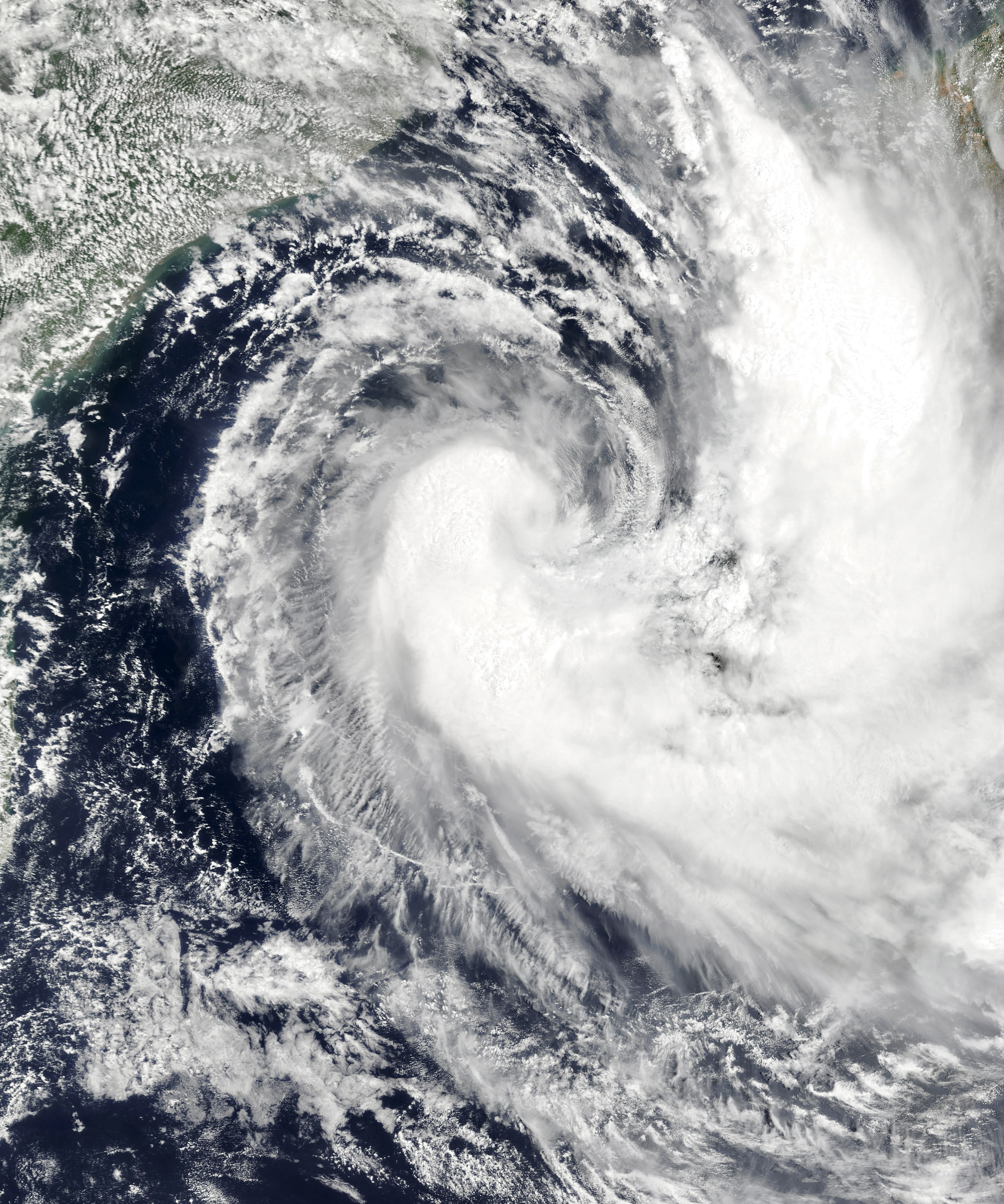
- Tropical Storm Cyprien shortly before achieving peak intensity on January 1

Meteorological history
- Formed: December 30, 2001
- Dissipated: January 3, 2002

Severe tropical storm
- 10-minute sustained (MFR)
- Highest winds: 100 km/h (65 mph)
- Lowest pressure: 980 hPa (mbar); 28.94 inHg

Tropical storm
- 1-minute sustained (SSHWS/JTWC)
- Highest winds: 95 km/h (60 mph)

Overall effects
- Fatalities: 2 missing
- Damage: $181,000 (2002 USD)
- Areas affected: Madagascar
- IBTrACS
- Part of the 2001–02 South-West Indian Ocean cyclone season

Severe Tropical Storm Cyprien (JTWC designation: 08S) was a short-lived tropical cyclone that caused minor damage in Madagascar. Forming on December 30, 2001, Cyprien quickly strengthened in a slightly favorable environment. By January 2, the storm attained its peak intensity with winds of 100 km/h (65 mph) according to Météo-France and 95 km/h (60 mph) according to the Joint Typhoon Warning Center. Later that day the storm made landfall in Morombe, at a weaker intensity, and dissipated early on January 3. Throughout the affected areas, Cyprien destroyed 957 structures, leaving 1.16 billion Malagasy franc (2002 MGF; US$181,000) in damages. No fatalities were reported; however two people were listed as missing.

== Meteorological history ==
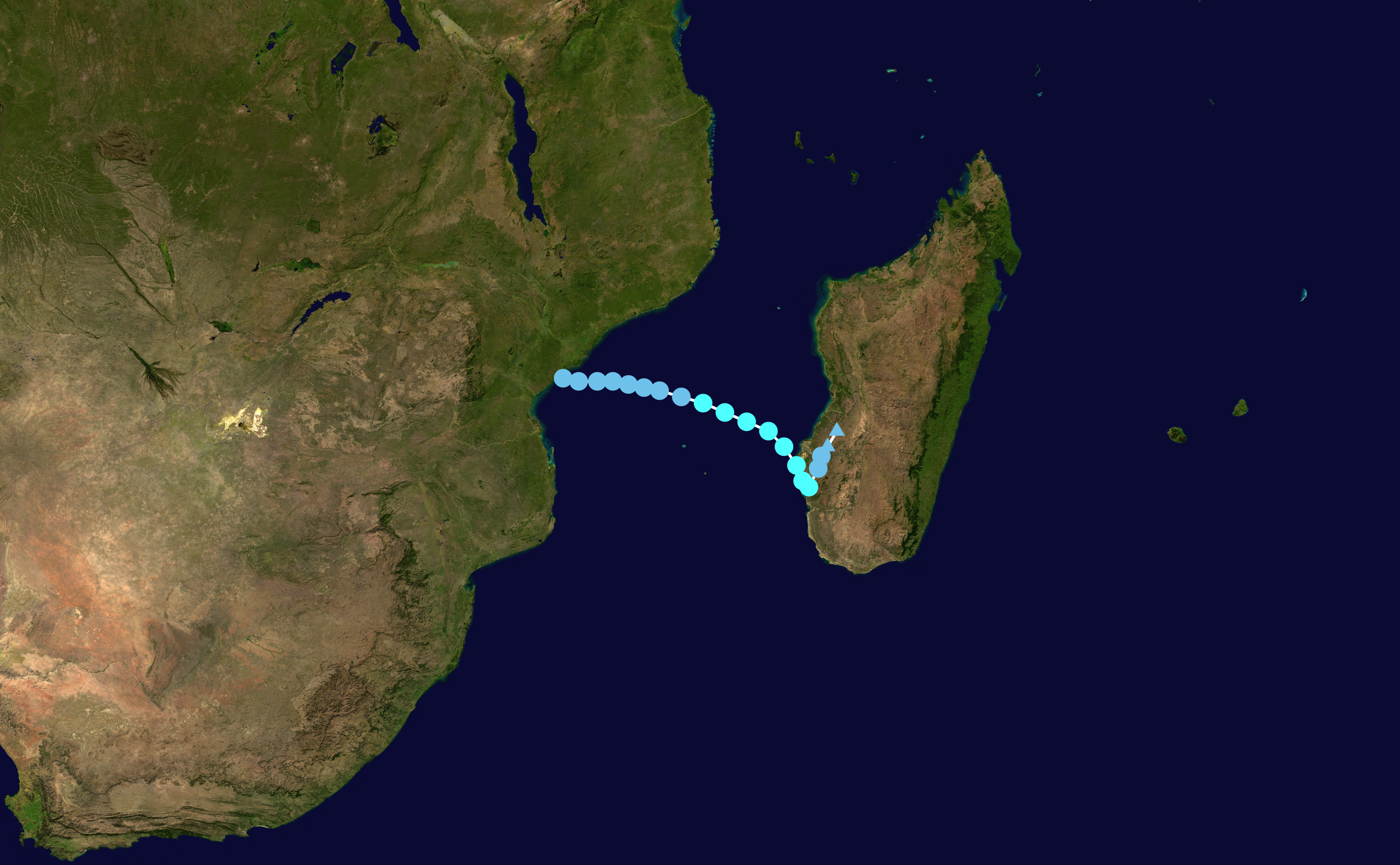
Map plotting the storm's track and intensity, according to the Saffir–Simpson scale Map key Saffir–Simpson scale Tropical depression (≤38 mph, ≤62 km/h) Tropical storm (39–73 mph, 63–118 km/h) Category 1 (74–95 mph, 119–153 km/h) Category 2 (96–110 mph, 154–177 km/h) Category 3 (111–129 mph, 178–208 km/h) Category 4 (130–156 mph, 209–251 km/h) Category 5 (≥157 mph, ≥252 km/h) Unknown Storm type Tropical cyclone Subtropical cyclone Extratropical cyclone, remnant low, tropical disturbance, or monsoon depression

On December 26, a cold front exited Mozambique in southeastern Africa into the Mozambique Channel. Upon reaching open waters, the front developed an area of convection and later a circulation just inland from the coast on December 27. The front dissipated but the circulation remained as a distinct low pressure area. Although there was high wind shear in the area, good divergence allowed for convection to continue developing. On December 30, Météo-France (MFR), the Regional Specialized Meteorological Center, designated the system as a tropical disturbance. Over the next two days, convection became increasingly organized, with banding features developing by December 31. That day, MFR upgraded the disturbance to a tropical depression, and around 0900 UTC, the Joint Typhoon Warning Center (JTWC) issued a Tropical Cyclone Formation Alert. Decreasing wind shear and moderate outflow would allow the system to intensify into a tropical storm.

On January 1, 2002, the JTWC classified the depression as a tropical storm, designating it as Tropical Cyclone 08S. The system rapidly organized shortly after and was further upgraded to a moderate tropical storm by Météo-France at 0600 UTC, at which time the Meteorological Service of Madagascar gave it the name Cyprien. In response to a mid to upper-level subtropical high pressure area, the storm tracked in a general eastward direction at 16 km/h (10 mph). Several hours after being named, the JTWC assessed Cyprien to have reached its peak winds of 95 km/h (60 mph 1-minute winds). QuickSCAT satellite passes indicated areas of 100 km/h (65 mph) winds early on January 2, prompting Météo-France to upgrade Cyprien to a severe tropical storm, with winds peaking at 100 km/h (65 mph 10-minute winds). By this time, the central barometric pressure fell to 980 hPa (mbar).

Later on January 2, the combination of the subtropical ridge to the north, an approaching mid-latitude trough and moderate to strong westerlies caused Severe Tropical Storm Cyprien to turn towards the southwest. Slight weakening took place shortly before the storm made landfall in Morombe; maximum winds decreased to 50 mph (85 km/h 10-minute winds). Increased wind shear and interaction with land caused the deep convection to become substantially displaced to the east from the center of circulation. Early on January 3, Cyprien was downgraded to a tropical depression by both agencies; however, some areas were still reporting gale-force winds. It turned to the northeast over land, dissipating late on January 3.

== Impact and aftermath ==
The precursor to Cyprien dropped heavy rainfall in Mozambique, including 92 mm (3.6 in) in Beira.

Due to the low-intensity of the storm, damages in southwestern Madagascar were moderate. Cyprien produced wind gusts as strong as 180 km/h (110 mph). Heavy rains also fell throughout the region, peaking at 232 mm (9.1 in). The hardest hit area was the city of Morombe; a total of 900 people in the city were affected by the storm and two people were reportedly missing. Following an assessment of the storm's impact, 180 homes and 16 administrative buildings were found to have been destroyed by Cyprien. Damages in the area amounted to 1.1 billion Malagasy franc (2002 MGF; US$172,507). North of Morombe, the city of Morondava also sustained significant damage; roughly 1,000 people were affected and 661 homes were destroyed. Numerous homes were inundated by floodwaters. Officials reported that floodwaters persisted until January 9. Damages in the city amounted to 60 million MGF (2002 MGF; US$9,287). In all, damages from the storm amounted to 1.16 billion MGF (2002 MGF; ~US$181,000).

Following Cyprien, the Government of Madagascar did not request international assistance in post-storm recovery. By January 10, a cargo plane carrying 65 million MGF (2002 MGF; US$10,062) worth of relief supplies was deployed to the affected regions. The supplies, consisting of medical supplies, tents, and one tonne of rice, were given to local authorities to be distributed to the affected population. Sanitary items were also distributed by the government to avoid an outbreak of water-borne diseases such as diarrhea and cholera.

== See also ==
- Tropical cyclones in 2002
- Weather of 2002
