= Cyclone Japhet =

South-West Indian cyclone in 2003

Intense Tropical Cyclone Japhet
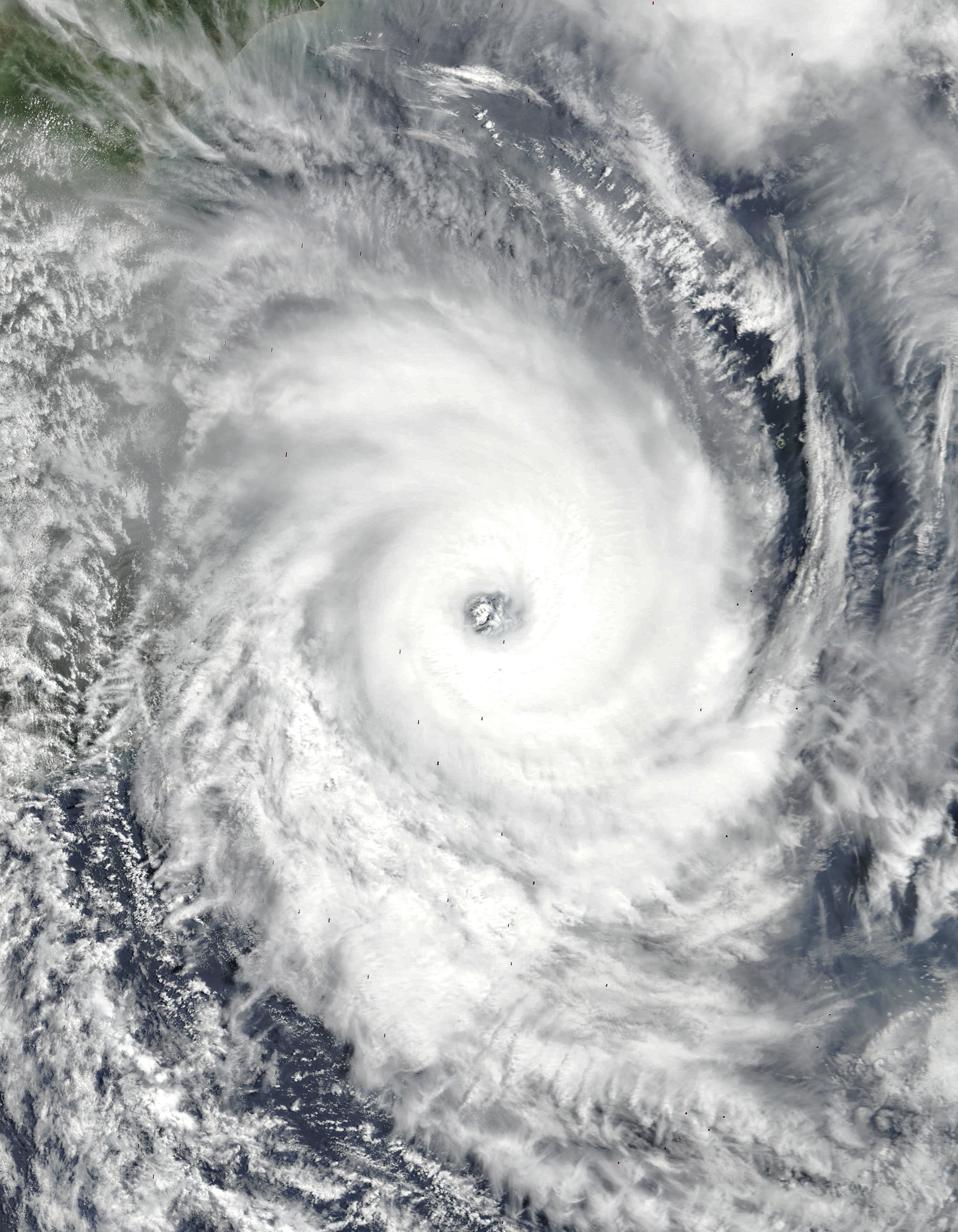
- Cyclone Japhet at peak intensity on March 1

Meteorological history
- Formed: February 25, 2003
- Dissipated: March 6, 2003

Intense tropical cyclone
- 10-minute sustained (MFR)
- Highest winds: 175 km/h (110 mph)
- Lowest pressure: 935 hPa (mbar); 27.61 inHg

Category 4-equivalent tropical cyclone
- 1-minute sustained (SSHWS/JTWC)
- Highest winds: 215 km/h (130 mph)
- Lowest pressure: 927 hPa (mbar); 27.37 inHg

Overall effects
- Fatalities: 25 total
- Areas affected: Mozambique, Zambia, Zimbabwe
- IBTrACS
- Part of the 2002–03 South-West Indian Ocean cyclone season

Intense Tropical Cyclone Japhet was a damaging tropical cyclone that affected southeast Africa in March 2003. It developed on February 25 near the southwest coast of Madagascar, and initially moved to the northwest before turning to the southwest. With favorable conditions for development, Japhet quickly intensified in the Mozambique Channel, reaching maximum winds of 175 km/h (109 mph) , sustained over 10 minutes. After stalling briefly, the cyclone turned to the northwest, weakening slightly before striking Mozambique just south of Vilankulo on March 2. Japhet slowly weakened while progressing inland, dissipating over Zambia on March 6.

Along its path, Japhet dropped heavy rainfall that caused widespread river flooding. The rains occurred after an extended drought, although excessive precipitation caused heavy crop damage, notably around where the storm moved ashore. In two provinces in Mozambique, the cyclone damaged or destroyed 25,000 houses, leaving at least 23,000 people homeless. Flooding in Zambia caused rivers to rise in Mozambique several days after the storm's passage. There were 17 deaths in Mozambique. Further inland, remnant rainfall destroyed a bridge and several houses in Zimbabwe, killing eight people.

== Meteorological history ==
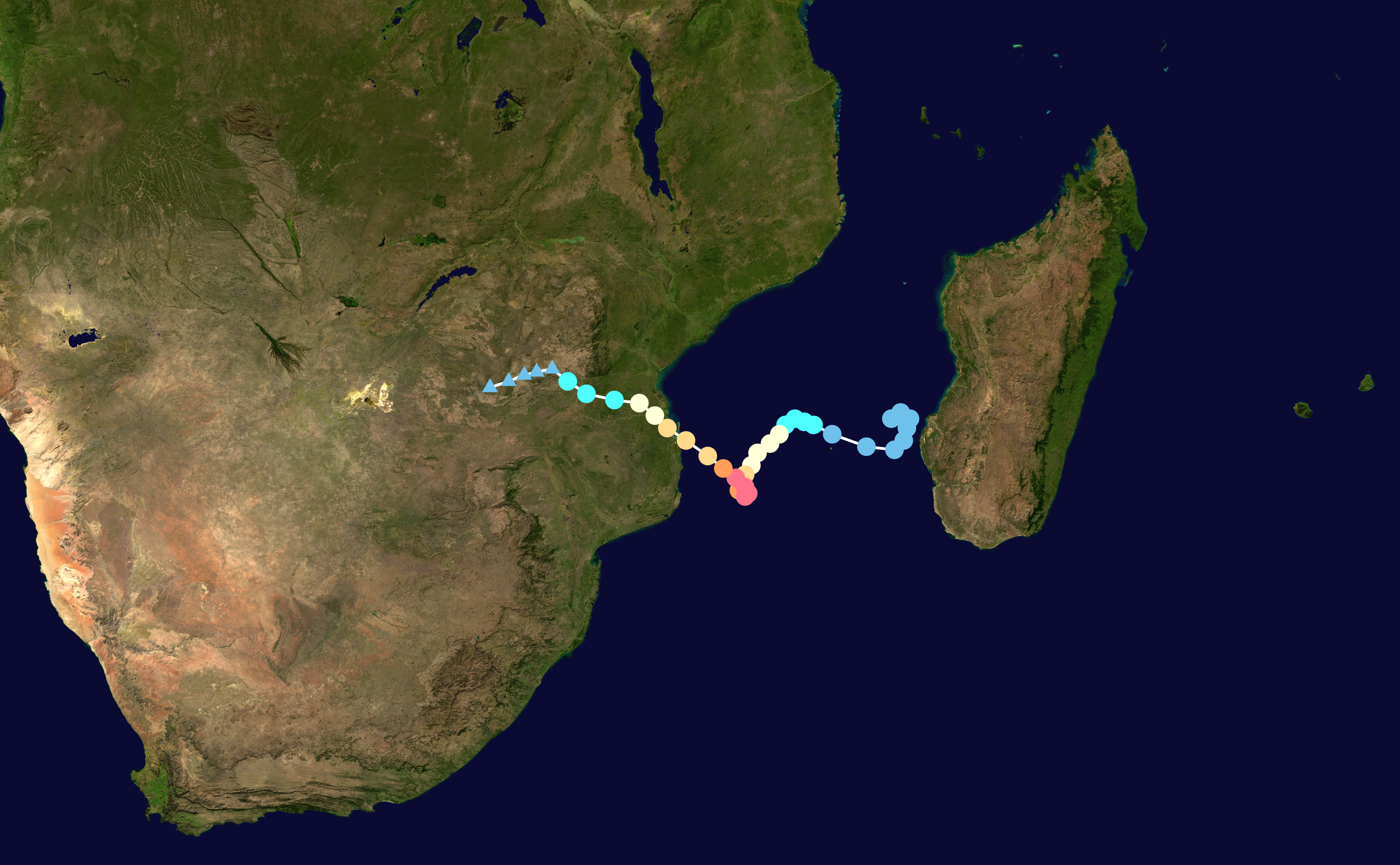
Map plotting the storm's track and intensity, according to the Saffir–Simpson scale Map key Saffir–Simpson scale Tropical depression (≤38 mph, ≤62 km/h) Tropical storm (39–73 mph, 63–118 km/h) Category 1 (74–95 mph, 119–153 km/h) Category 2 (96–110 mph, 154–177 km/h) Category 3 (111–129 mph, 178–208 km/h) Category 4 (130–156 mph, 209–251 km/h) Category 5 (≥157 mph, ≥252 km/h) Unknown Storm type Tropical cyclone Subtropical cyclone Extratropical cyclone, remnant low, tropical disturbance, or monsoon depression

On February 23, the Joint Typhoon Warning Center (JTWC) began monitoring an area of convection in the Mozambique Channel. On February 25, Météo France (MF) initiated advisories on Tropical Disturbance 13 when the system was located along the southwest coast of Madagascar. Later that day, the JTWC issued a Tropical Cyclone Formation Alert, noting that environmental conditions favored development, including weak wind shear. The system developed organized convection in a circular pattern, and on February 26, the MF and JTWC upgraded the system to Tropical Depression 13 and Tropical Cyclone 19S, respectively. With a mid-level ridge to the south, the depression moved generally westward, and after intensifying further, it was upgraded to Tropical Storm Japhet by the Direction de la Météorologie et de l'Hydrologie of Madagascar late on February 26.

After attaining tropical storm status, Japhet quickly intensified while it began moving to the southwest, due to a break in the ridge. At 0000 UTC on February 28, the MF assessed that the storm strengthened into a tropical cyclone – a storm with 10 minute sustained winds of 120 km/h (75 mph). This was about 12 hours after the JTWC upgraded Japhet to the same intensity but with 1 minute sustained winds. About 18 hours after designating Japhet as a tropical cyclone, MF estimated the storm attained 10 minute sustained winds of 165 km/h (103 mph) and upgraded the storm to an intense tropical cyclone; this made Japhet only the sixth such cyclone in the Mozambique Channel in 24 years. After further intensification, the cyclone peaked in intensity on March 1. The JTWC estimated 1 minute sustained winds of 215 km/h (134 mph) with gusts to 260 km/h (160 mph), while MF estimated 10 minute sustained winds of 175 km/h (109 mph).

Cyclone Japhet maintained its peak winds for about 24 hours, during which it remained nearly stationary. Subsequently, the storm began a northwest track toward the Mozambique coast, gradually weakening due to decreased outflow and dry air. At about 1700 UTC on March 2, Japhet made landfall just south of Vilankulo, Mozambique, with winds of 160 km/h (99 mph) as estimated by the JTWC. The cyclone gradually weakened over land, decreasing below tropical cyclone status by early on March 3. Japhet crossed into southern Zimbabwe, and both JTWC and MF discontinued warnings before Japhet dissipated on March 5.

== Impact and aftermath ==
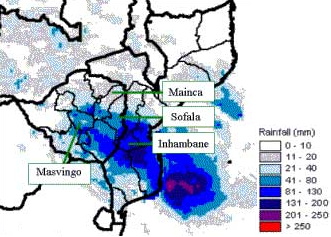
Satellite-estimated rainfall for Cyclone Japhet

While Japhet was developing, the pressure gradient between it and a ridge produced winds of 93 km/h (58 mph) on Europa Island in the Mozambique Channel. Heavy rains affected southwestern Madagascar, but there was no major damage.

Before Japhet struck Mozambique, the local Red Cross office mobilized volunteers, including 100 people in Inhambane Province who assisted local officials in preparations. The cyclone affected the same region that Cyclone Delfina struck two months prior. Japhet produced high winds and heavy rainfall in southern and central Mozambique into southern Zimbabwe. The rains were beneficial in alleviating drought conditions, and dry grounds absorbed much of the excess rainfall. After entering Zimbabwe, Japhet's rainfall caused the Save River to rise, causing flooding in southern Mozambique several days after the storm passed the area. The resulting floods affected 50,000 people in several villages. The Limpopo River also rose to above-normal level. High rains also caused some crop damage, destroying 237,000 hectares (585,600 acres) of crop fields. This included 12,325 downed cashew trees, 6,955 wrecked banana plants, and 2,495 killed livestock, all in Vilankulo; however, the rains allowed farming conditions to improve due to wetter conditions in drought areas.

Before Japhet moved ashore, Vilankulo reported sustained winds of 74 km/h (46 mph), with gusts to 105 km/h (65 mph). There, the winds destroyed the roofs or damaged the doors and windows of 95% of brick houses. In Inhambane Province in southern Mozambique, the cyclone destroyed several boats, cut power lines, and disrupted roads with flooding or downed trees, which prevented communication with the province. The storm destroyed 500 classrooms, 35 government buildings, and 7 health facilities. The cyclone damaged or destroyed 25,000 houses in Inhambane and Sofala provinces, leaving about 23,000 people homeless in Inhambane alone, which was the worst-affected province. Three people were injured in Morrumbene by a fallen tree. There were 17 deaths in the country, which was less than from previous cyclones due to advance warning and coordinated government action.

The Zambia Meteorological Department warned of the potential of intense precipitation before Japhet moved into the region. In neighboring Zimbabwe, ten hours of high rainfall nearly overtopped the Manyuchi Dam and destroyed a bridge. The storm also damaged crops and destroyed houses in the country, killing eight people.

After the storm struck Mozambique, the World Food Programme distributed more than 4,300 tons of food to affected citizens. The agency had to transport goods via helicopter due to damaged or flooded roads. The country's primary north–south highway, which was damaged by the storm, had emergency repairs and was reopened within three days. Mozambique's National Disaster Management Institute distributed 70 tonnes (69 long tons; 77 short tons) of maize, 8 tonnes (7.9 long tons; 8.8 short tons) of beans, and 80 tents to storm victims. Lingering floods in Zimbabwe contributed to an increase in malaria cases. The Delta Corporation donated $6 million worth of blankets and food to residents in the country.

== See also ==
- Tropical cyclones in 2003
- Weather of 2003
