= Tropical Storm Delfina =

South-West Indian tropical storm in 2002 and 2003

Severe Tropical Storm Delfina
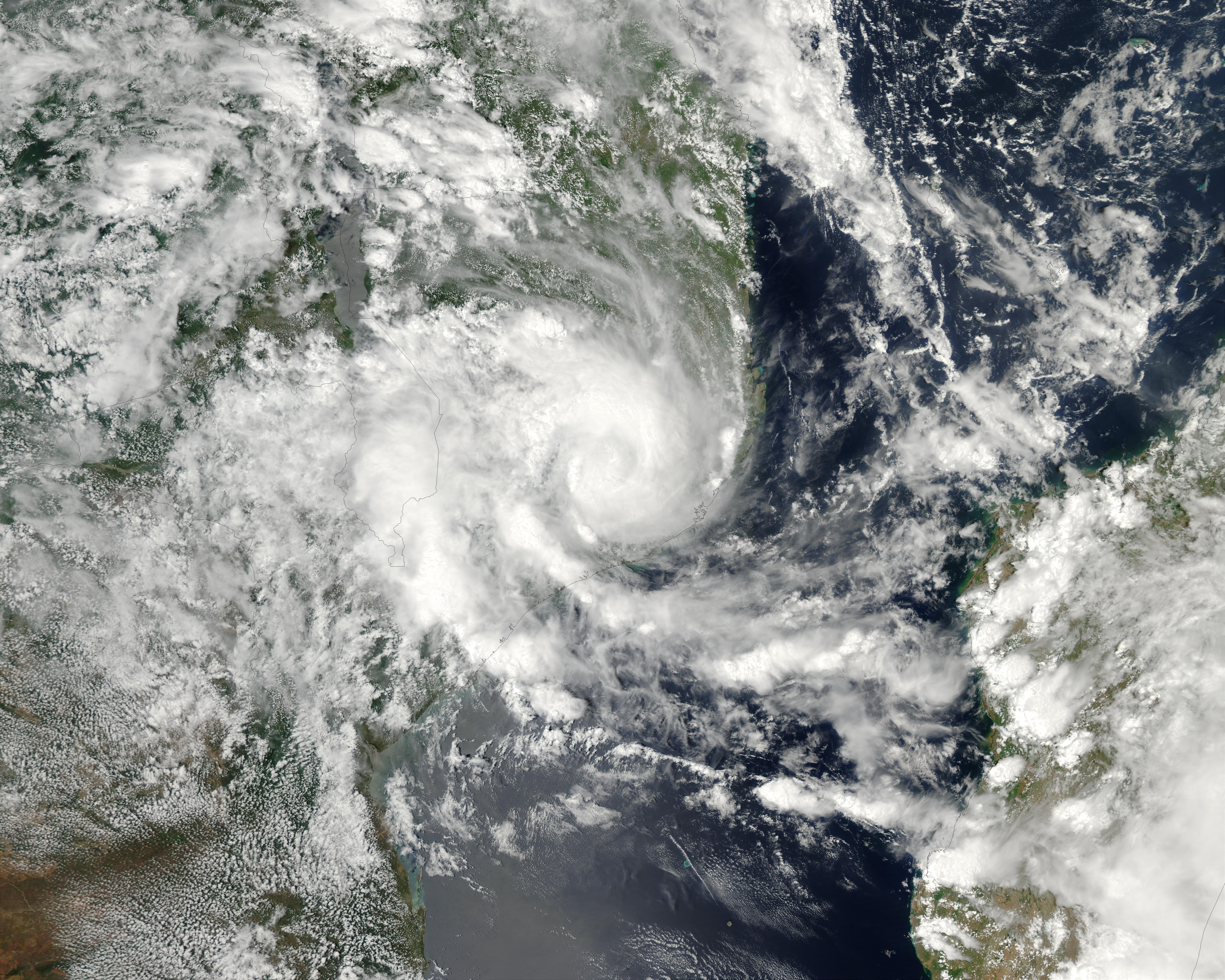
- Satellite image of Delfina on January 1

Meteorological history
- Formed: December 30, 2002
- Dissipated: January 1, 2003

Severe tropical storm
- 10-minute sustained (MFR)
- Highest winds: 95 km/h (60 mph)
- Lowest pressure: 984 hPa (mbar); 29.06 inHg

Tropical storm
- 1-minute sustained (SSHWS/JTWC)
- Highest winds: 100 km/h (65 mph)
- Lowest pressure: 984 hPa (mbar); 29.06 inHg

Overall effects
- Fatalities: 54 direct
- Damage: $3.5 million (2003 USD)
- Areas affected: Mozambique, Malawi
- IBTrACS
- Part of the 2002–03 South-West Indian Ocean cyclone season

Severe Tropical Storm Delfina was a damaging tropical cyclone that affected southeastern Africa in January 2003. The fourth named storm of the 2002–03 South-West Indian Ocean cyclone season, Delfina formed off the northwest coast of Madagascar on December 30, 2002. It quickly intensified while moving westward, becoming a strong tropical storm before hitting northeastern Mozambique on December 31. Delfina weakened while moving inland, and it was no longer classifiable as a tropical cyclone by January 1, 2003. However, its remnants moved across the country and into Malawi, later looping around and crossing back over Mozambique; the remnants of Delfina were last observed on January 9.

In both Mozambique and Malawi, Delfina dropped heavy rainfall that caused flooding. In the former country, over 18,000 houses were severely damaged or destroyed, leaving thousands homeless. The storm damaged roads and bridges, which disrupted relief efforts in the aftermath, and floods destroyed widespread areas of crops in the midst of an ongoing food shortage. Lingering flooding caused an outbreak of cholera and malaria in Mozambique, and 47 people were killed by Delfina. In Malawi, flooding was not widespread, although the storm destroyed about 3,600 houses and killed eight people. Only two months after the storm struck, however, Cyclone Japhet left damage and deaths in many of the same areas that Delfina affected.

== Meteorological history ==
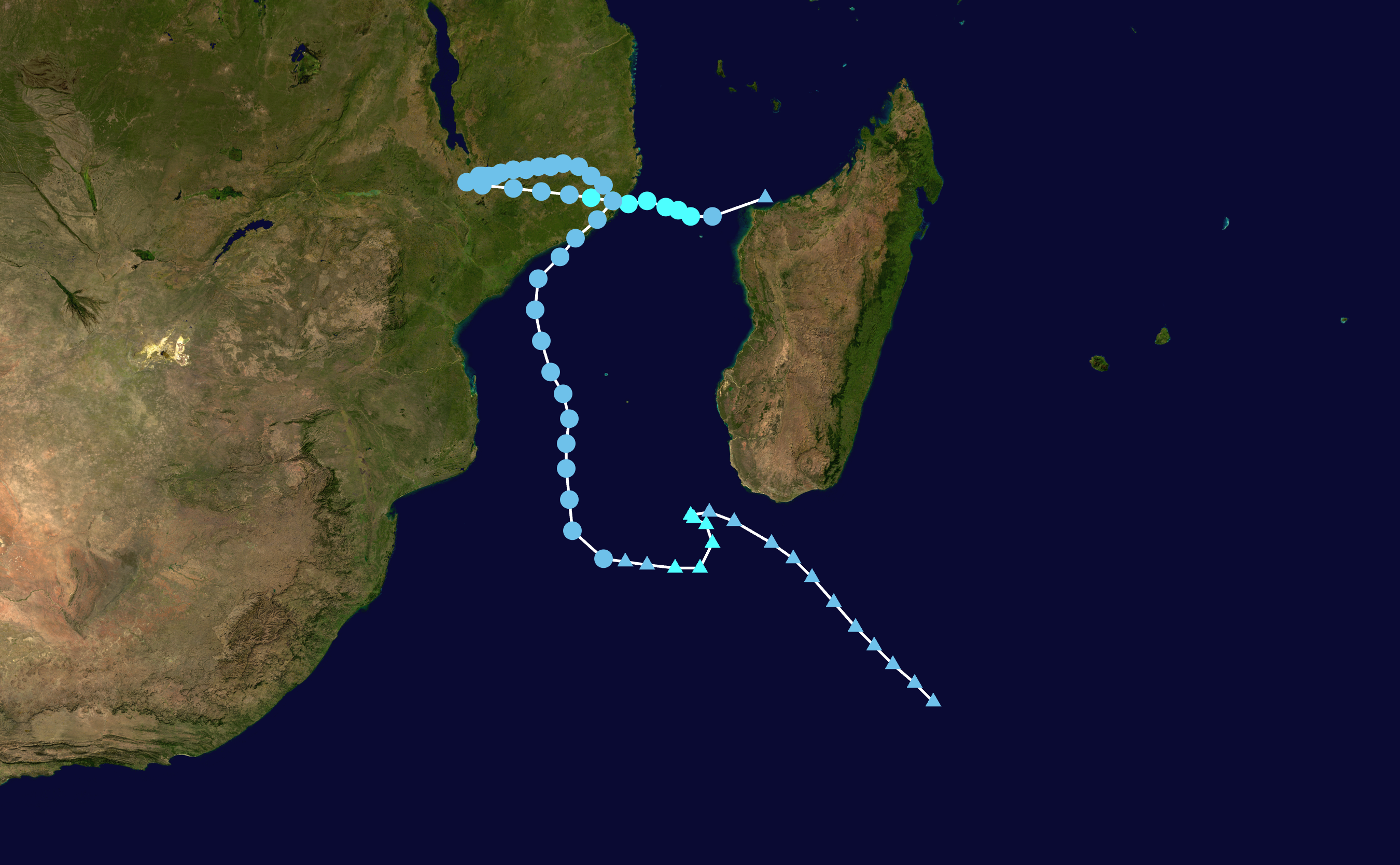
Map plotting the storm's track and intensity, according to the Saffir–Simpson scale Map key Saffir–Simpson scale Tropical depression (≤38 mph, ≤62 km/h) Tropical storm (39–73 mph, 63–118 km/h) Category 1 (74–95 mph, 119–153 km/h) Category 2 (96–110 mph, 154–177 km/h) Category 3 (111–129 mph, 178–208 km/h) Category 4 (130–156 mph, 209–251 km/h) Category 5 (≥157 mph, ≥252 km/h) Unknown Storm type Tropical cyclone Subtropical cyclone Extratropical cyclone, remnant low, tropical disturbance, or monsoon depression

At 1100 UTC on December 30, 2002, the Joint Typhoon Warning Center (JTWC) (Note: The Joint Typhoon Warning Center is a joint United States Navy – United States Air Force task force that issues tropical cyclone warnings for the western Pacific Ocean and other regions.) noted in its Significant Tropical Weather Outlook that an area of convection persisted in the Mozambique Channel off the northwest coast of Madagascar. The system had a weak circulation, located in an area of minimal wind shear. At 1200 UTC that day, Météo-France (Note: The Regional Tropical Cyclone Advisory Centre in Reunion, operated by Météo-France, is the official Regional Specialized Meteorological Center for the South-West Indian Ocean.) classified the system as the sixth zone of disturbed weather of the season. It quickly developed, organizing into Tropical Disturbance 6 at 1800 UTC on December 30. At around the same time, the JTWC initiated advisories on Tropical Cyclone 08S. The convection became better organized, developing outflow and rainbands. With a ridge to the south, the storm tracked in a generally westward direction toward Mozambique. At 0600 UTC on December 31, MFR upgraded the system to Tropical Depression 6, and six hours later the agency upgraded it to Tropical Storm Delfina.

While approaching the Mozambique coastline, Delfina quickly intensified, developing en eye feature and reaching maximum 1-minute sustained winds of 100 km/h (65 mph). At 1800 UTC on December 31, MFR estimated peak 10-minute sustained winds of 95 km/h (60 mph). At about 2130 UTC, Delfina made landfall near Angoche in eastern Mozambique. It rapidly weakened while moving inland, and MFR discontinued advisories early on January 1, 2003. Delfina entered Malawi on January 2, where dry air affected the storm. The remnants turned to the northeast, drifting into Mozambique and later turning to the south. On January 6, it crossed over its track and emerged into the Mozambique Channel. When the remnants reached the Mozambique Channel, they were reclassified as Tropical Disturbance 07, which moved southward over waters. It re-intensified into a tropical storm on January 8 before weakening the next day, becoming extratropical. The remnants persisted for several days, dissipating on January 14.

== Impact and aftermath ==
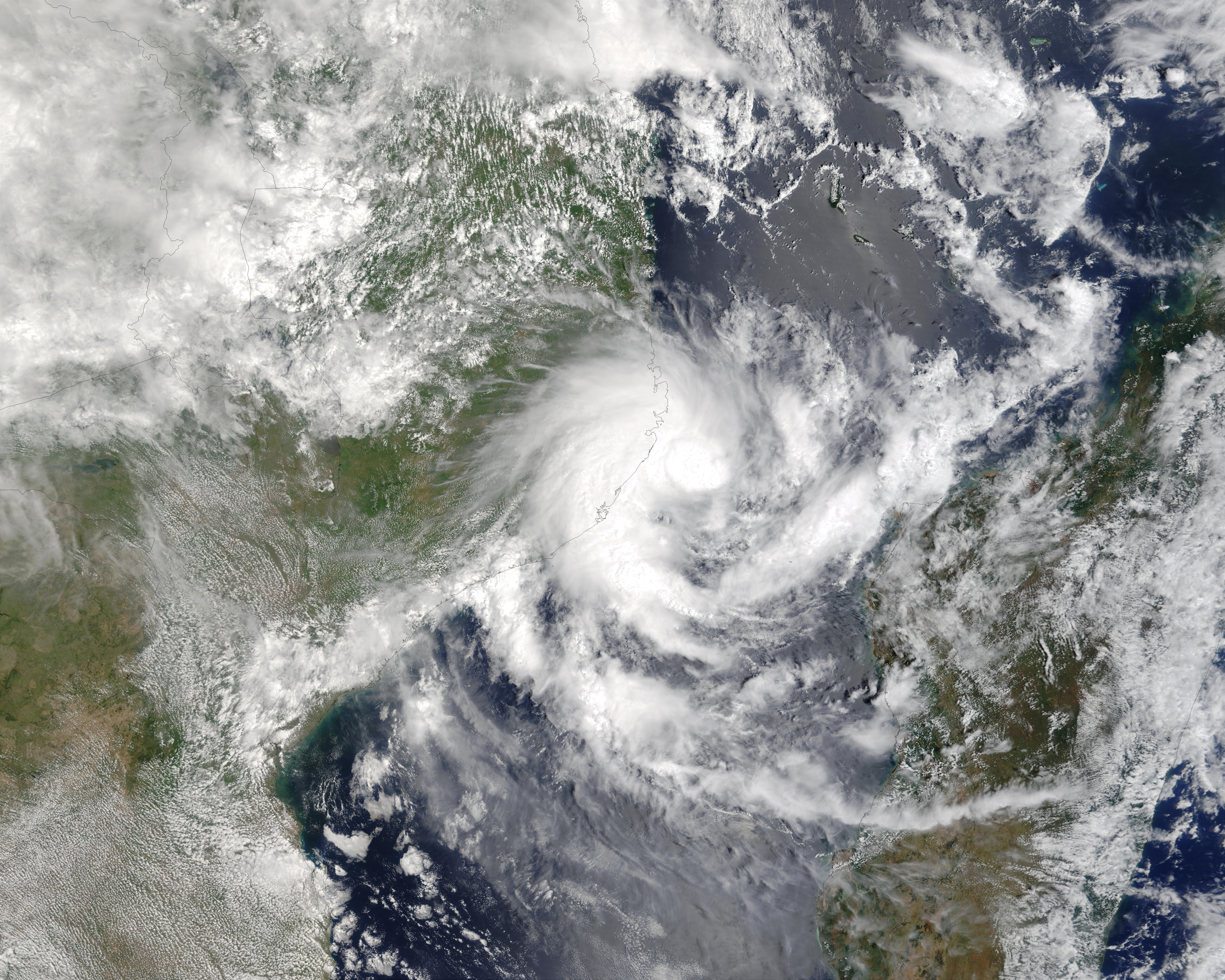
Satellite image of Delfina near landfall on December 31

Upon striking Mozambique, Delfina produced strong winds and heavy rains, particularly in the northern portion of the country. A station in Nampula reported 281 mm (11.1 in) in a 48‑hour period. Delfina washed out roads and bridges in Nampula and Zambezia provinces, which isolated towns and disrupted the transportation network. A train derailed due to effects from the storm, which cut rail travel between northern Mozambique and neighboring Malawi. The cyclone destroyed or severely damaged over 18,000 houses, which directly affected about 133,000 people, mostly in Nampula where 22,000 people were displaced. Floods along the Ligonha River forced 1,800 people to leave their homes. In Nampula and Zambezia, Delfina damaged four health facilities and 376 schools. The storm caused a power outage in Nampula for several days, and in Monapo, there were water shortages after the storm. The cyclone destroyed over 2,000 ha (4,900 acres) of beans and cassava crops and knocked down thousands of cashew trees, in areas already affected by food shortages due to drought conditions. Overall, Delfina resulted in $3.5 million in damage (2003 USD), and caused 47 deaths in the country, at least 19 due to flooding.

After Delfina moved through Mozambique, the local Red Cross chapter provided shelter, water, and relief items to the affected residents. Residual flooding in northern Mozambique, compounded with lack of drinking water, caused a cholera outbreak that affected at least 400 people. By January 27, 12 people had died from the disease. Flooding also caused a malaria outbreak that killed 45 people in the country. Government officials deployed food to the affected areas by airplane and by road, after workers repaired damaged bridges. Residents in Mozambique gradually recovered from storm damage in the weeks after it struck. Only two months after the storm struck, however, Cyclone Japhet left damage and deaths in many of the same areas.

In neighboring Malawi, the storm's remnants caused flooding in seven provinces, although it was not widespread. Delfina damaged roads, and destroyed one rail bridge in Balaka District. The storm destroyed about 3,600 houses; which forced about 30,000 people to leave their homes. The floods affected 57,000 properties, damaging 23,500 ha (58,000 acres) in the midst of a food shortage. Delfina killed eight people in Malawi, prompting President Bakili Muluzi to declare the country as a disaster area on January 11. After the storm, the Red Cross provided blankets and food for the affected residents. The damaged rail line that initially prevented relief supplies from entering the country was repaired in early February.

== See also ==
- Tropical cyclones in 2002
- Weather of 2002
- Cyclone Nadia – deadly cyclone that struck Mozambique in 1994
- Tropical Storm Chedza - deadly tropical cyclone that struck Mozambique and Madagascar in 2015
