= Rivière Tamarin =

River in Mauritius

Coordinates: 19°44′S 63°25′E

Rivière Tamarin is a river in southwest Mauritius. It is the outflow of the country's largest lake, Mare aux Vacoas. From there it flows west over the cascades known as the Tamarind Falls, reaching the Indian Ocean close to the village of Tamarin. Its total length is some 12 kilometres. It is located in the Black River District.
