= Tamarind Falls =

Series of waterfalls in Mauritius

Coordinates: 20°20′40″S 57°27′59″E

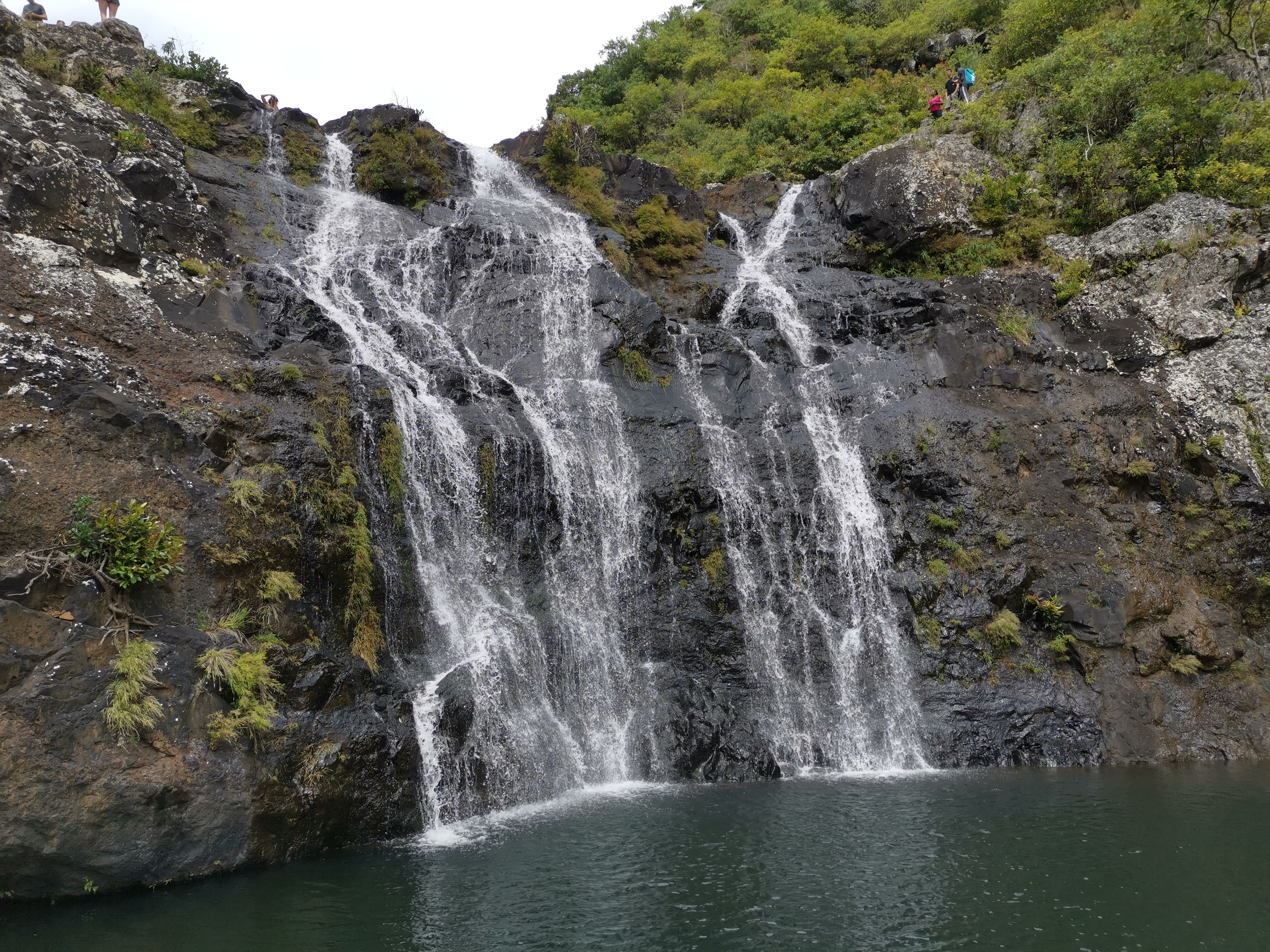

The Tamarind Falls or Tamarin Falls are a scenic attraction of southwest Mauritius. They are a series of seven cataracts located on the Rivière Tamarin, two kilometers northwest of the large lake Mare aux Vacoas.
