= 2002–03 South-West Indian Ocean cyclone season =

Cyclone season in the South-West Indian Ocean

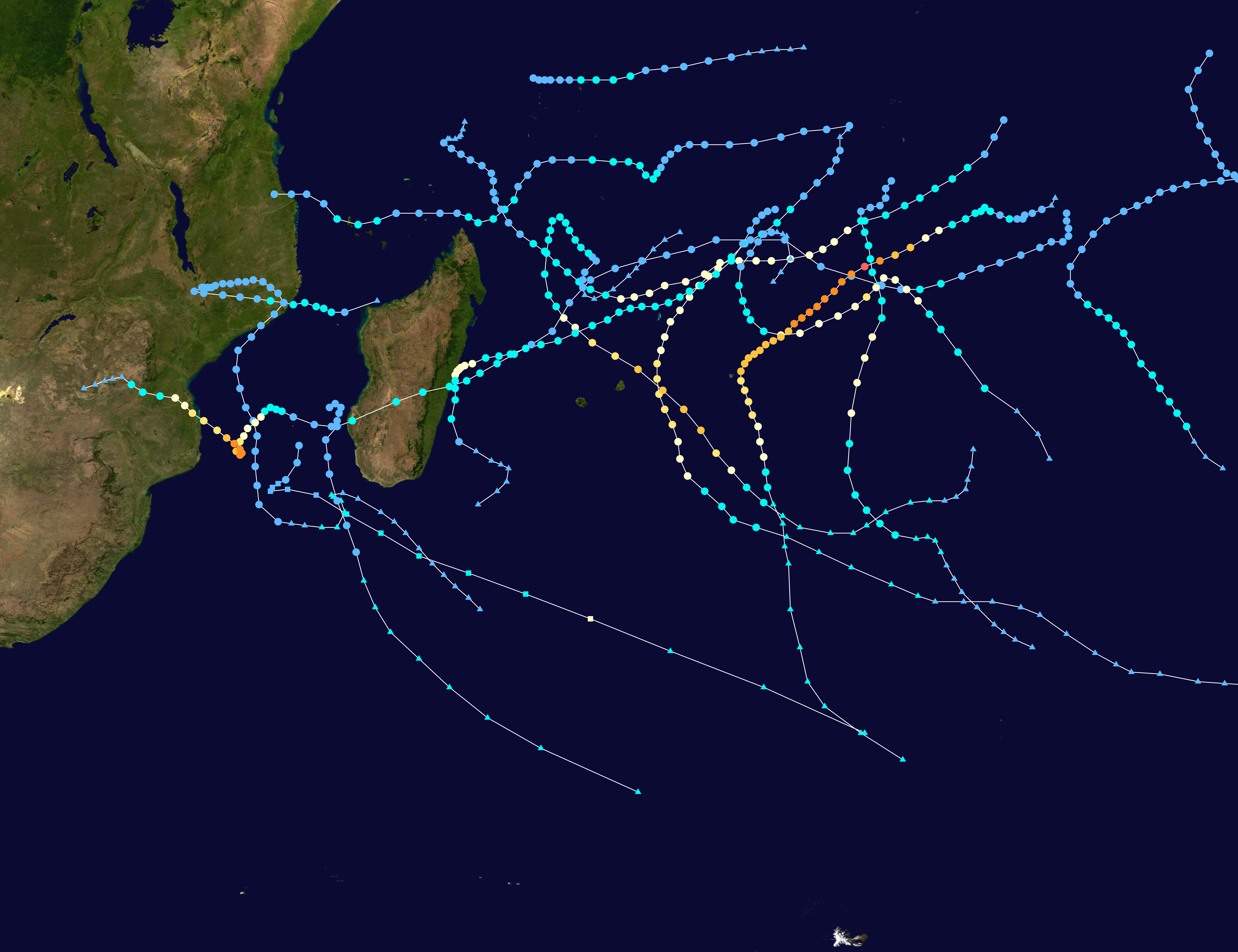
- Season summary map

Seasonal boundaries
- First system formed: September 5, 2002
- Last system dissipated: May 10, 2003

Strongest storm
- Name: Kalunde
  - Maximum winds: 215 km/h (130 mph) (10-minute sustained)
  - Lowest pressure: 910 hPa (mbar)

Seasonal statistics
- Total disturbances: 14
- Total depressions: 14
- Total storms: 12
- Tropical cyclones: 7
- Intense tropical cyclones: 3
- Total fatalities: >169
- Total damage: > $6.7 million (2003 USD)

Related articles
- 2002–03 Australian region cyclone season; 2002–03 South Pacific cyclone season

The 2002–03 South-West Indian Ocean cyclone season was one of the longest lasting and the fourth-most active season in the South-West Indian Ocean. Storms during the season impacted the Mascarene Islands, Seychelles, Madagascar, and countries in south-eastern Africa. The season began early when an unnamed tropical storm struck Seychelles in September, becoming the most damaging storm there in 50 years. The next system, Atang, was the first named storm of the season, but was only a tropical depression; it was named due to the threat to an outer island of Mauritius. Atang later struck Tanzania in a climatologically unusual area in November, resulting in unconfirmed deaths of fishermen. The first named storm to reach tropical storm intensity was Boura, which brushed the Mascarene Islands with gusty winds and rainfall. In December, Cyclone Crystal threatened to strike Mauritius but instead veered eastward, and later, Tropical Storm Delfina lasted from late December through early January 2003. Delfina damaged or destroyed thousands of houses in Mozambique and Malawi, killing 54 people.

In January 2003, Severe Tropical Storm Ebula continued the steady activity, forming in the eastern portion of the basin. Later, Tropical Storm Fari crossed southern Madagascar with heavy rains, causing flooding and mudslides that left 3,400 people homeless. In February, there were four simultaneous tropical cyclones in the Indian Ocean, three of which in the basin. Cyclone Gerry formed first and the farthest west, passing just east of Mauritius and killing one person there. Cyclone Hape formed shortly thereafter, and Tropical Storm Isha formed farther east, having originated from the Australian basin. Cyclone Japhet struck southern Mozambique and produced widespread flooding in south-eastern Africa, killing 25 people. In March, Cyclone Kalunde was the strongest storm of the season, reaching 10-minute sustained winds of 215 km/h (134 mph). It struck Rodrigues while weakening, damaging 1,600 houses and causing an island-wide power outage. About a month later, a subtropical cyclone named Luma intensified south-east of Madagascar and developed an eye. Lastly, Cyclone Manou was only the sixth May tropical cyclones on record, making a rare landfall in south-eastern Madagascar, killing 89 people and destroying thousands of houses.

== Season summary ==
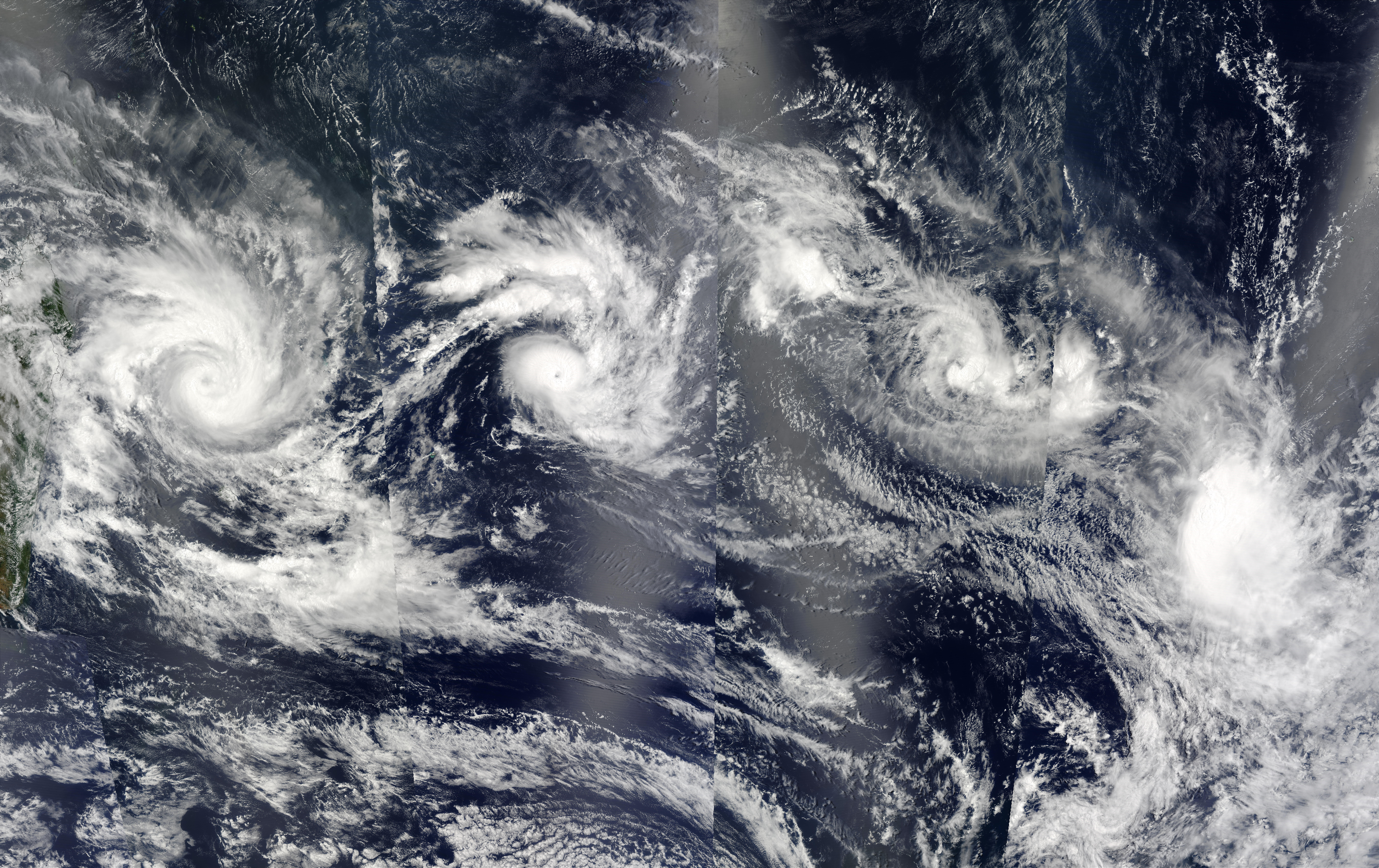
Four tropical storms active on February 12; from left to right are Gerry, Hape, the system that would become Isha, and Fiona in the Australian region

Météo-France's meteorological office in Réunion (MFR) is the official Regional Specialized Meteorological Center for the South-West Indian Ocean, tracking all tropical cyclones from the east coast of Africa to 90° E. At the beginning of the season, the MFR moved the tropical cyclone year from August 1 to July 1. The Joint Typhoon Warning Center (JTWC), which is a joint United States Navy – United States Air Force task force that issues tropical cyclone warnings for the region, also issued advisories for storms during the season.

During the season, MFR issued advisories on 16 systems, of which 13 intensified to reach tropical storm force winds, meaning conditions were generally favorable for tropical cyclogenesis. The 13 systems with tropical storm force winds is only one short of the most such storms since the beginning of satellite-tracking in the 1967–68 season, set in the 1993–94 season. This is four more than the average of nine named storms. In this season, there were 24 days on which tropical cyclones were active, slightly above normal, but only one storm—Kalunde—remained at that intensity for more than three days. By contrast, there were 68 days in which a tropical storm was active in the basin, which is 15 days above normal. The season began early and ended late; only four seasons began earlier and four ended later than this season since the start of satellite-coverage in the basin.

In addition to the named storms and an unnamed tropical storm in September, there was one non-developing tropical depression. On December 25, Tropical Depression 05 developed in the north-eastern portion of the basin. It moved to the south and later south-east, crossing into the Australian region on December 27. A day later, the JTWC issued its last advisory.

== Systems ==
=== Moderate Tropical Storm 01 ===
- Moderate tropical storm (MFR)
- Tropical storm (SSHWS)
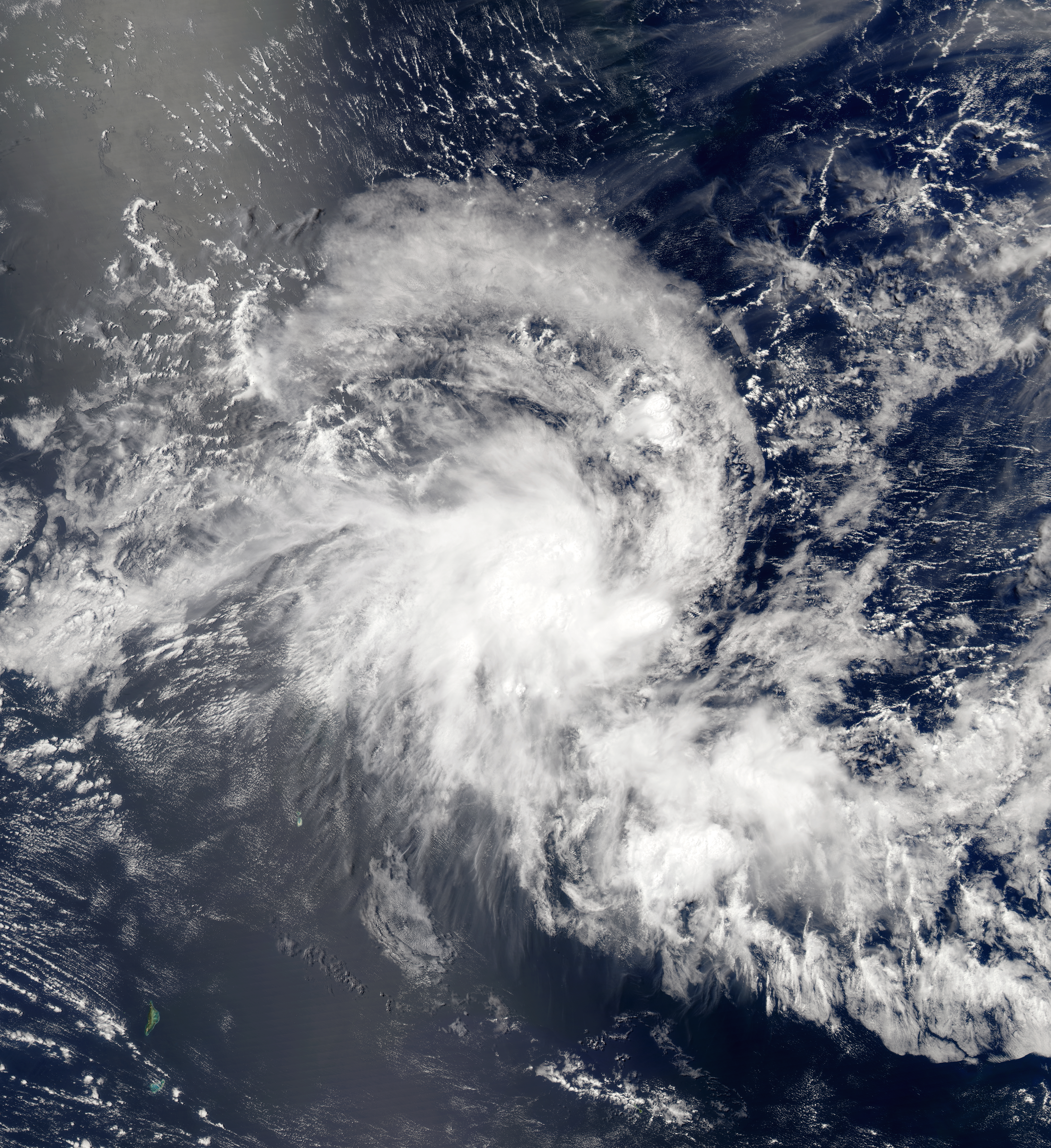
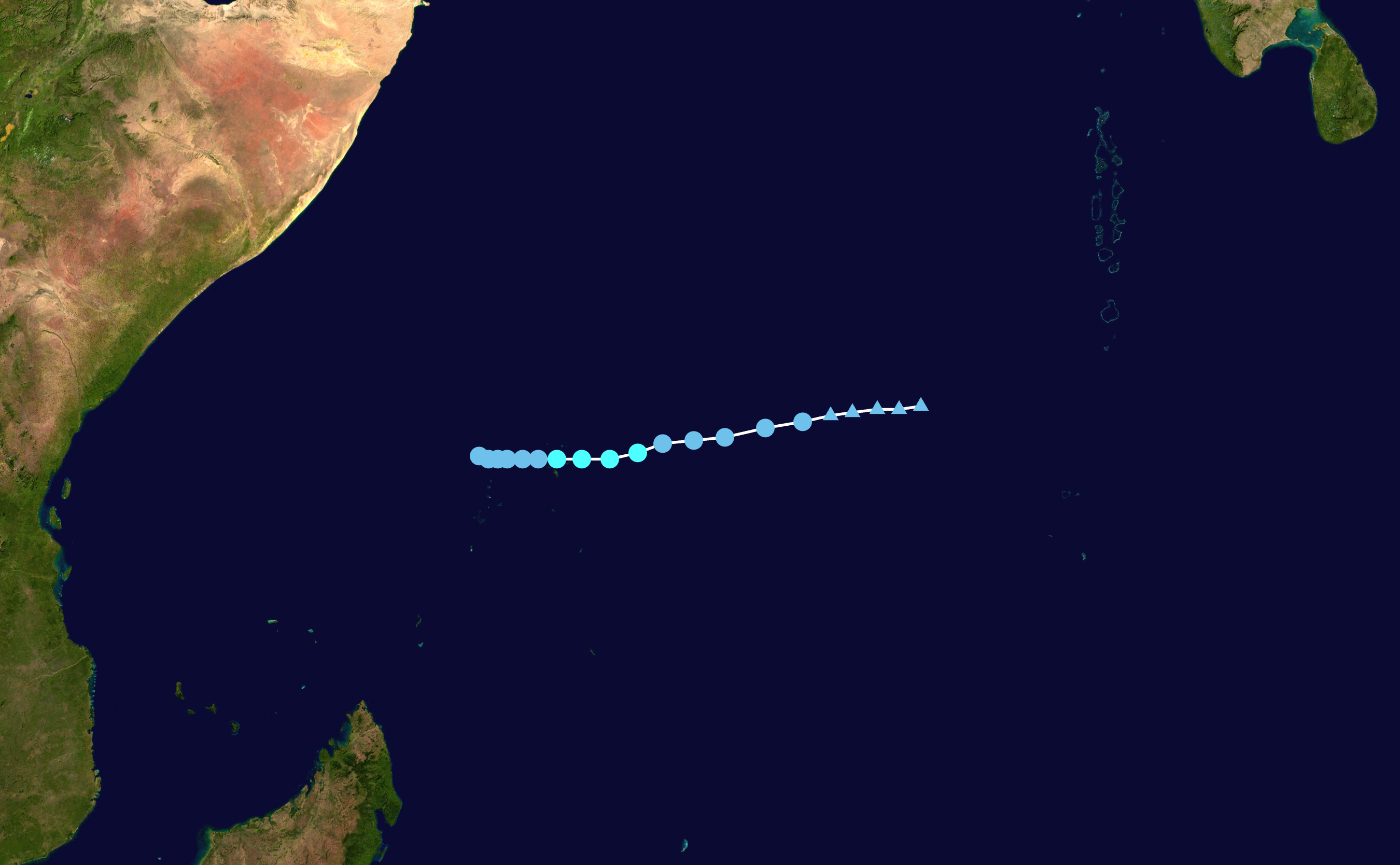
- Duration: September 5 – September 8
- Peak intensity: 65 km/h (40 mph) (10-min); 1003 hPa (mbar)

In late August, a weak low-level circulation persisted near Diego Garcia. It was associated with a trough near the equator, and initially remained disorganized due to high wind shear. The disturbance was located at a low latitude near the equator, and a ridge extending from the eastern coast of Africa imparted a general west-south-west movement. The system was organized enough to be classified by MFR on September 5 at 3.1° S. Subsequently, the system developed more convection as its circulation became better defined. Operationally, MFR began issuing warnings on September 5 on Tropical Disturbance 01, and the next day upgraded it to a tropical depression. Post analysis from MFR indicated that the system reached peak winds of 65 km/h (40 mph) on September 6, the same day that the Joint Typhoon Warning Center (JTWC) initiated advisories on it as Tropical Cyclone 01S. The storm developed banding features, but the thunderstorms were sheared away from the circulation. On September 7, the storm moved through Seychelles—an island nation in the southern Indian Ocean—before weakening. MFR discontinued advisories on September 8, and the JTWC followed suit the next day.

While moving through Seychelles, the storm produced a microburst that lasted for two hours across several islands, producing wind gusts up to 130 km/h (81 mph) on Praslin. Heavy rainfall affected Praslin, La Digue, and particularly Mahé, which reported 327.1 mm (12.88 in) in a 24‑hour period. Damage on Mahé was limited to landslides and some flooding. On Praslin, high winds damaged the roofs of over 50 houses and destroyed six homes, while the airport was also damaged. The winds damaged 50 power lines, causing an island-wide power outage. High winds also downed about 30,000 trees, which blocked roads but were quickly removed. Due to widespread tree damage, Cousin Island—a nature preserve—was closed for about two weeks, accounting for about $50,000 (2002 USD, SR250,000 rupees) in damage. Nationwide, the storm left 375 families homeless and damaged crop fields, becoming the most damaging in the country in 50 years.

=== Tropical Depression Atang ===
- Tropical depression (MFR)
- Tropical storm (SSHWS)
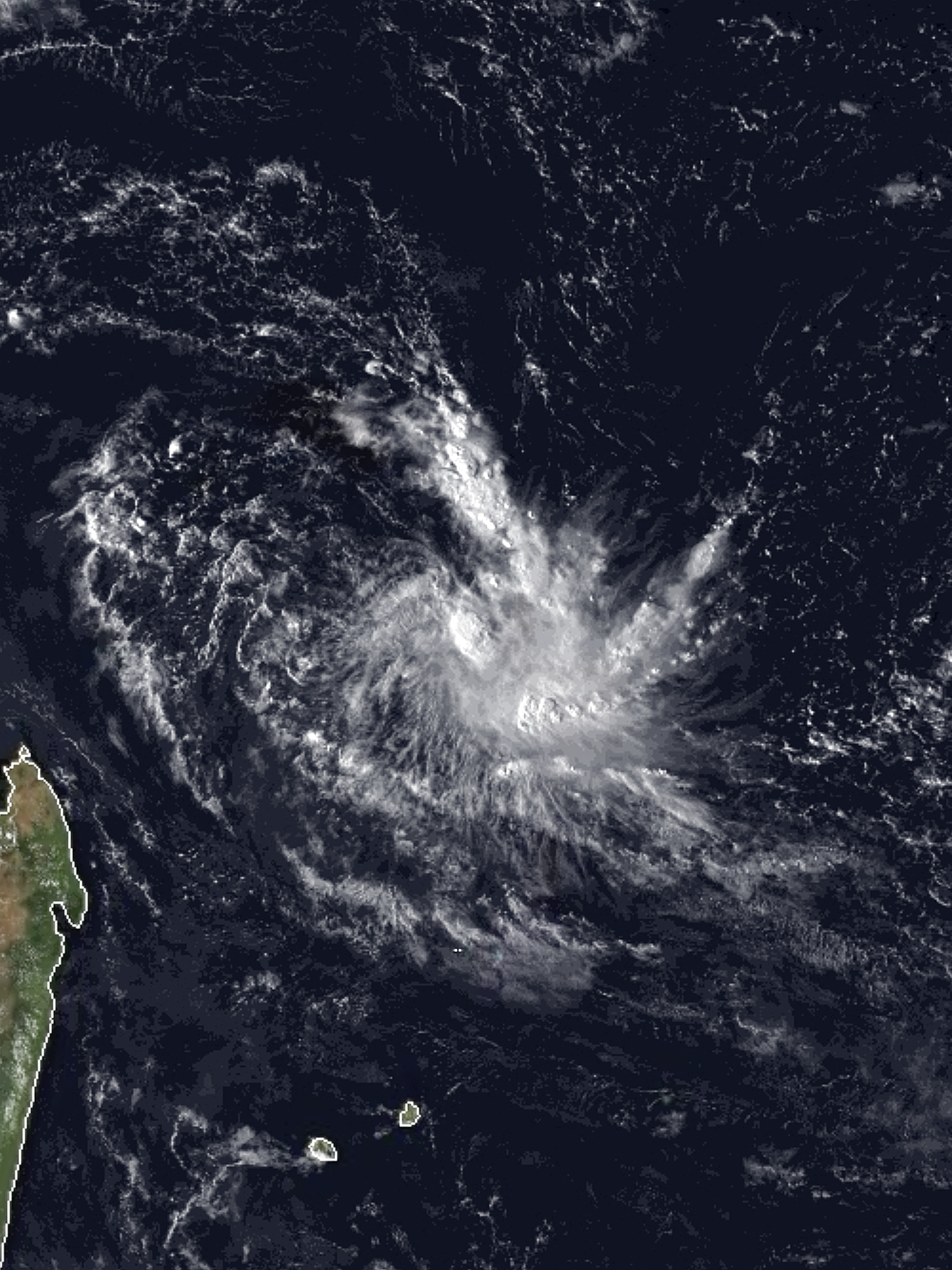
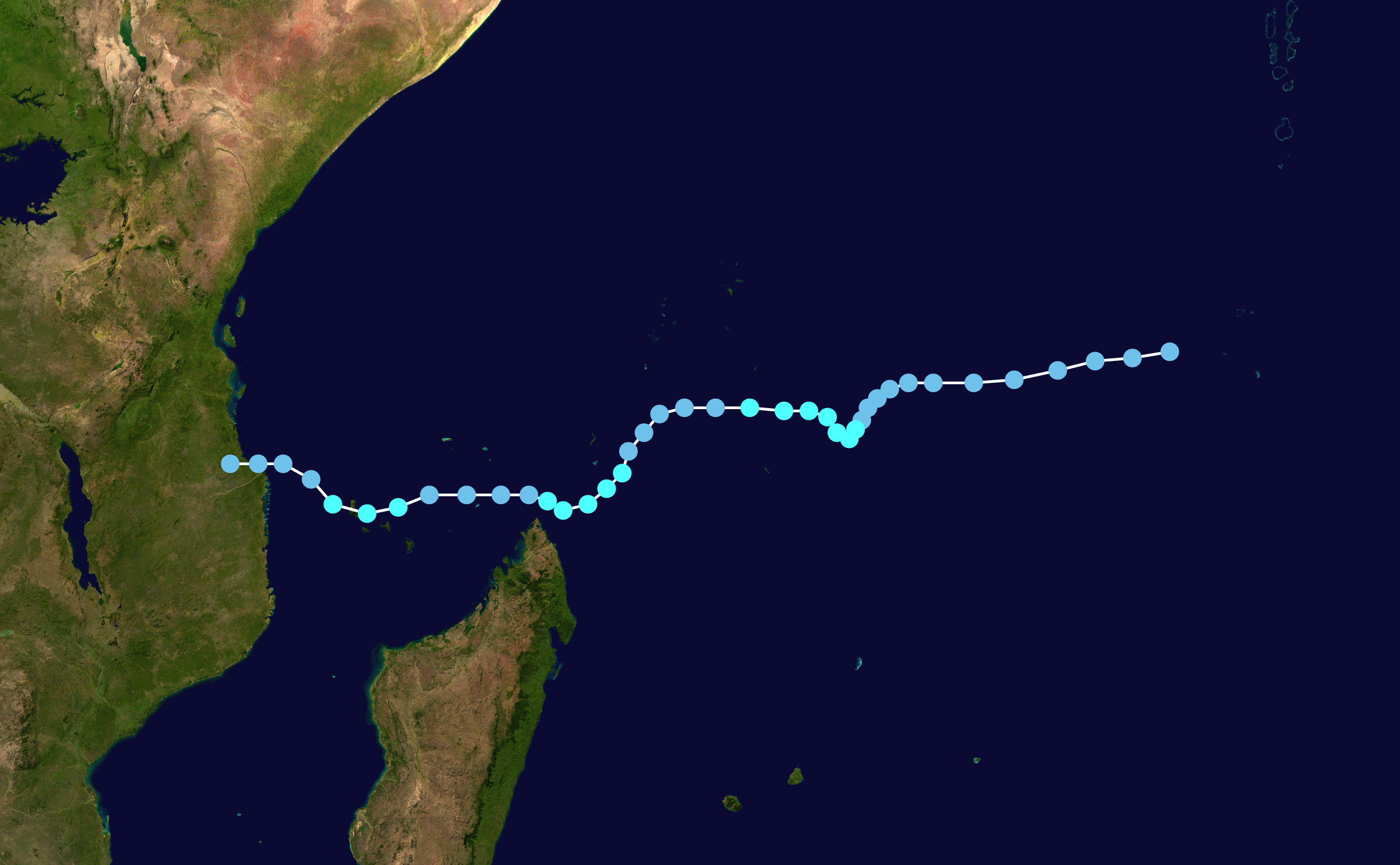
- Duration: November 4 – November 13
- Peak intensity: 55 km/h (35 mph) (10-min); 997 hPa (mbar)

Convection persisted near a broad circulation on November 3 to the west of Diego Garcia. The system moved westward and organized due to generally favorable conditions. MFR classified it as Tropical Disturbance 02 on November 4. Two days later, the agency upgraded it to Tropical Depression 2, and shortly thereafter the JTWC initiated advisories on Tropical Cyclone 02S. At that time, the storm was moving to the south-west toward the Mauritius outer island of Agaléga, developing improved outflow. To emphasize the threat, the Meteorological Service of Mauritius named the system Atang, despite it only being a tropical depression. Late on November 6, JTWC estimated peak winds of 85 km/h (53 mph), around the same time that Atang began a slow motion to the southwest. The next day, the depression resumed a westward motion and became disorganized, with several circulations, and the JTWC and MFR both discontinued advisories. The remnants of Atang again turned to the south-west and re-intensified, prompting JTWC and MFR to re-issue advisories on November 9. By that time, the outflow improved, although it maintained multiple circulations. Atang passed near the north coast of Madagascar on November 10 after turning to the west, and that day the JTWC again discontinued advisories. After another period of re-organization, the agency again re-issued advisories on Atang on November 11 over the Mozambique Channel. The next day, the system moved inland in south-eastern Tanzania, and dissipated shortly thereafter.

In northern Mozambique, Atang produced moderate but beneficial rainfall in Cabo Delgado Province. The landfall area does not usually experience tropical cyclones, and damage in Mozambique was minimal. In Tanzania, there were unofficial reports that Atang killed several fishermen and caused heavy rainfall with wind gusts to 148 km/h (92 mph).

=== Tropical Cyclone Boura ===
- Tropical cyclone (MFR)
- Category 1 tropical cyclone (SSHWS)
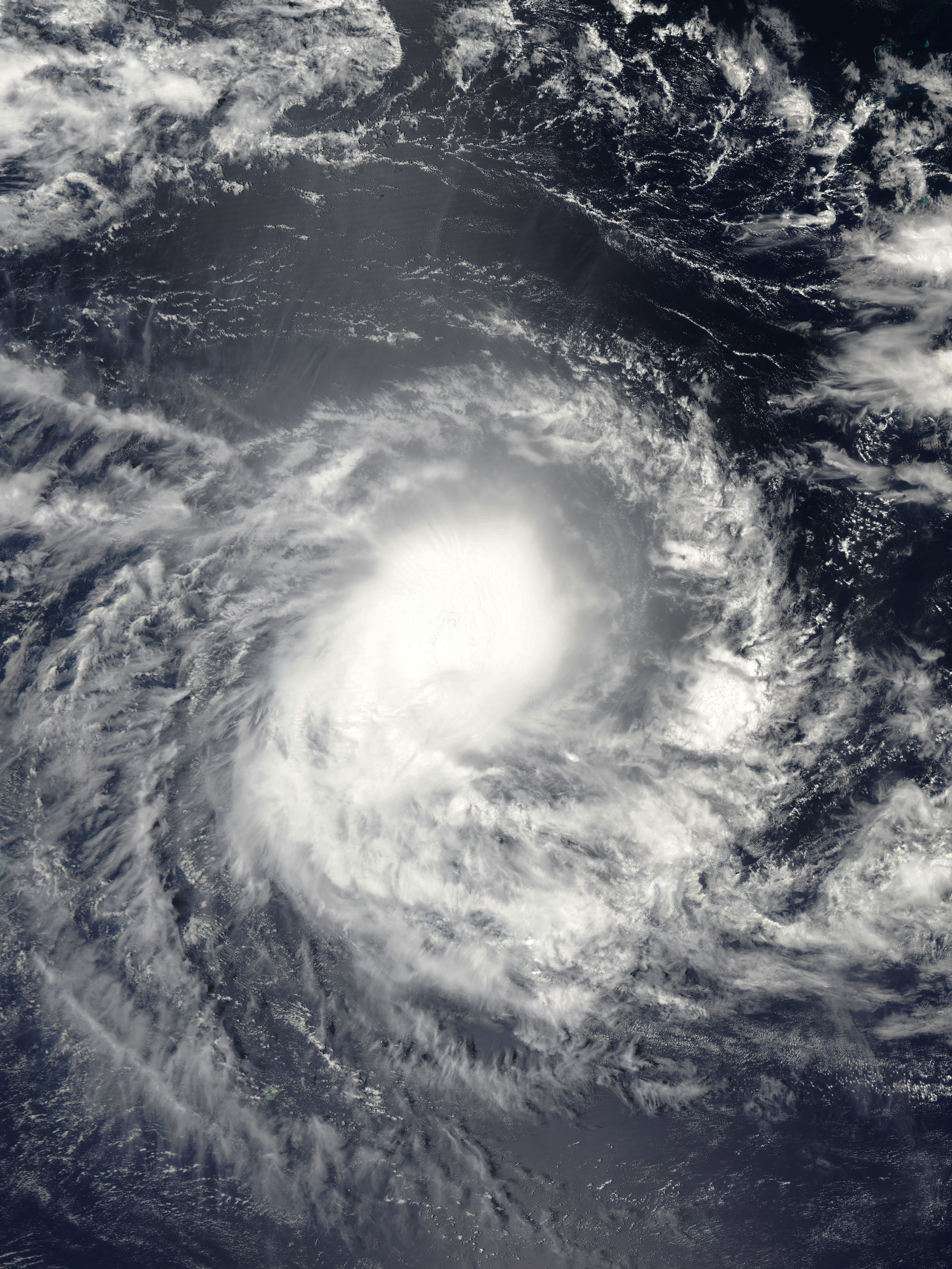
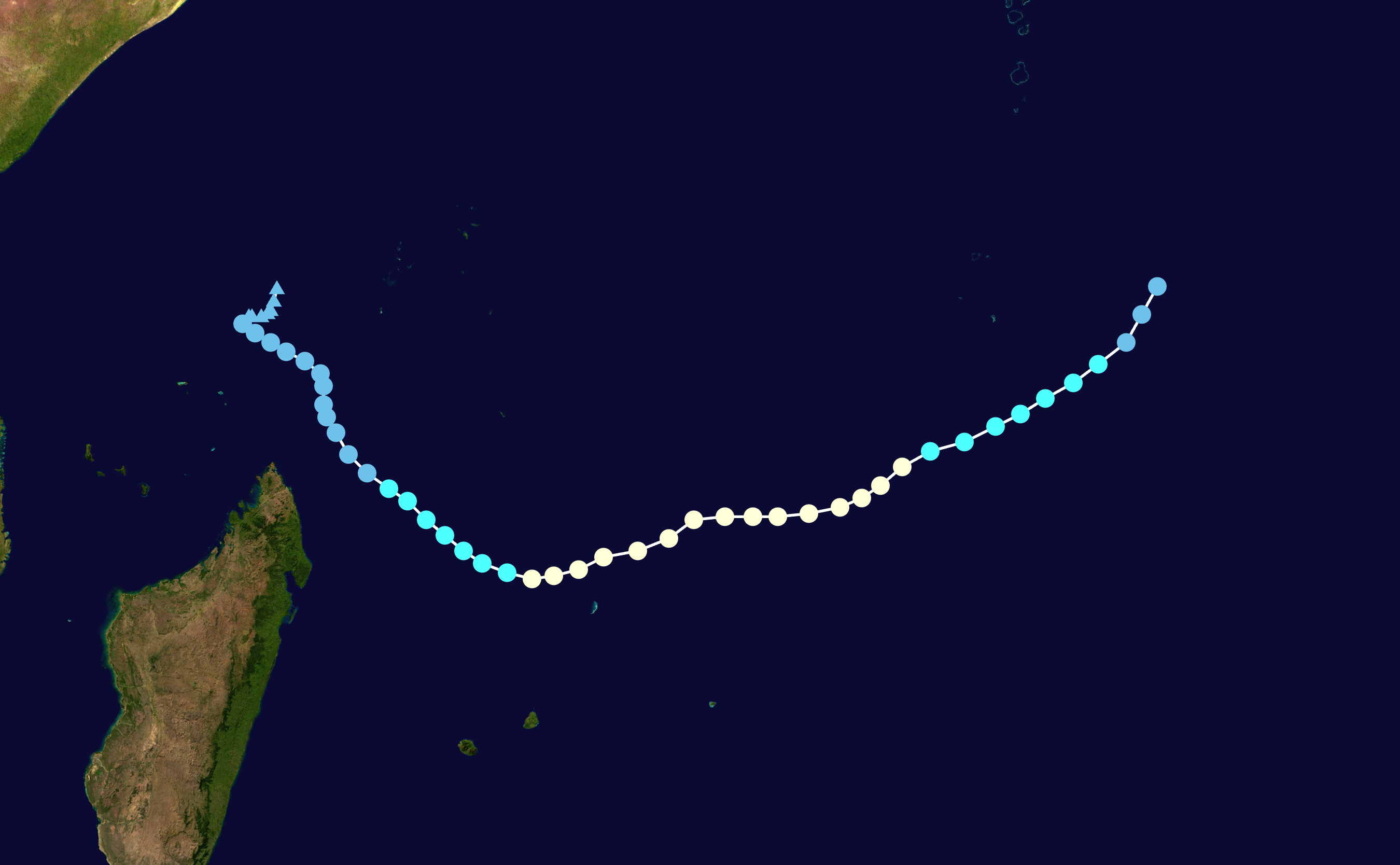
- Duration: November 14 – November 27
- Peak intensity: 130 km/h (80 mph) (10-min); 965 hPa (mbar)

A strong area of winds near the equator developed an area of convection on November 14 to the east-north-east of Diego Garcia. It quickly developed outflow and a distinct circulation, becoming a tropical depression late on November 14. Early on November 15, MFR upgraded the system to Tropical Storm Boura, and later that day the JTWC initiated advisories on Tropical Cyclone 03S. With a ridge to the south-east, the storm moved quickly southwestward. Easterly wind shear prevented significant intensification until the circulation became established beneath the convection. On November 17, Boura intensified to reach 10-minute winds of 120 km/h (75 mph), making it a tropical cyclone. The JTWC upgraded Boura to the same intensity that day but in 1-minute winds, or the equivalent of a minimal hurricane. The cyclone intensified slightly further to peak winds of 130 km/h (81 mph).

Boura maintained its peak winds for about 18 hours, during which wind shear began to increase. The cyclone weakened as it curved more to the west, a change due to a ridge to the south. The JTWC estimated that Boura maintained peak winds of 140 km/h (87 mph). Initially, the storm retained good outflow and convection, and Boura passed just north of St. Brandon on November 19, producing 54.5 mm (2.15 in) of rainfall and wind gusts of 106 km/h (66 mph). While the storm turned to the west and northwest, it interacted with the ridge to the south to produce wind gusts of 118 and 111 km/h (73 and 69 mph) on Mauritius and Réunion, respectively. The convection gradually diminished, and on November 22 Boura weakened to tropical depression status while the JTWC discontinued advisories. The circulation continued to the northwest, devoid of convection. After turning to the north-east on November 25, Boura dissipated a day later north of Madagascar.

=== Tropical Cyclone Crystal ===
- Tropical cyclone (MFR)
- Category 2 tropical cyclone (SSHWS)
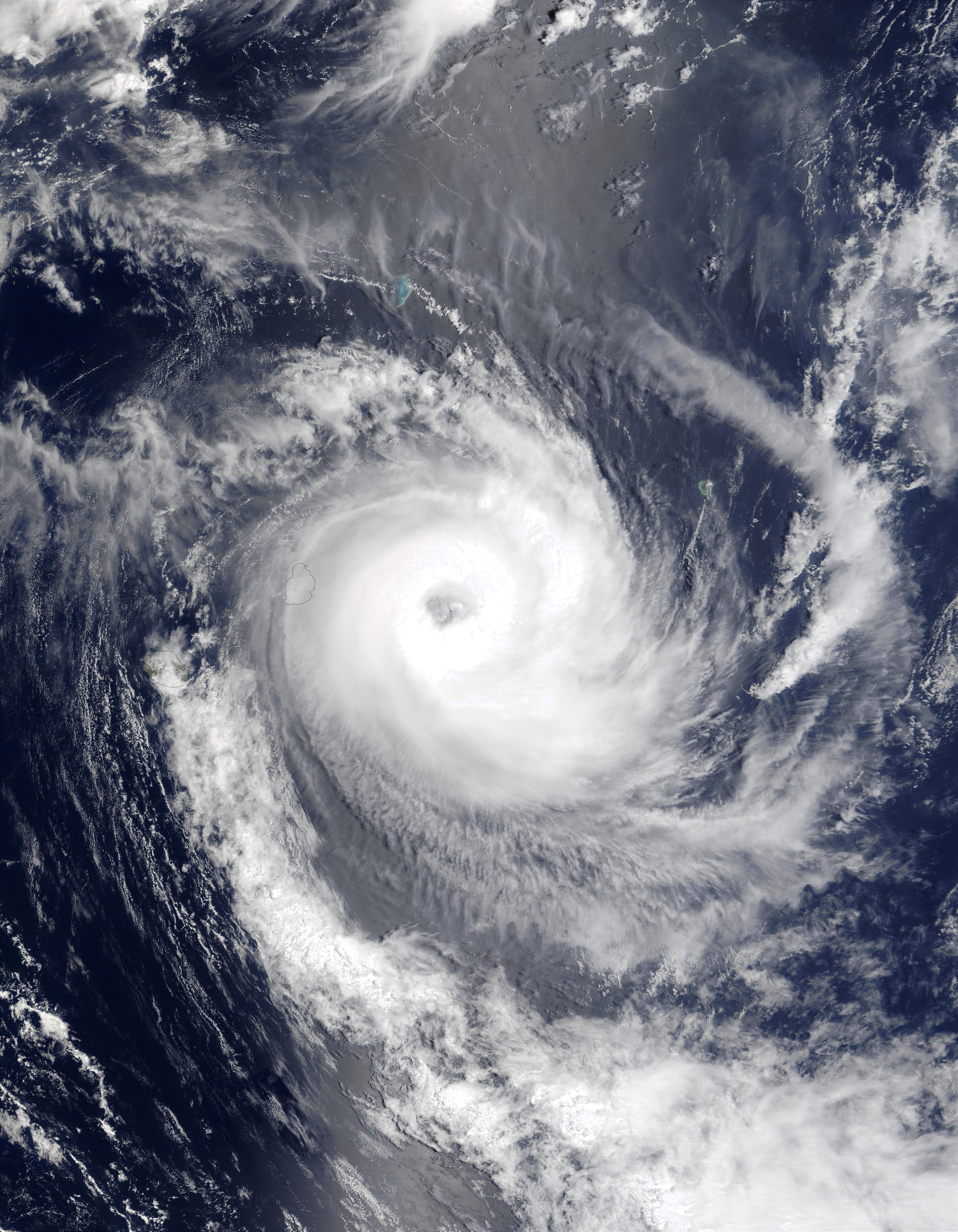
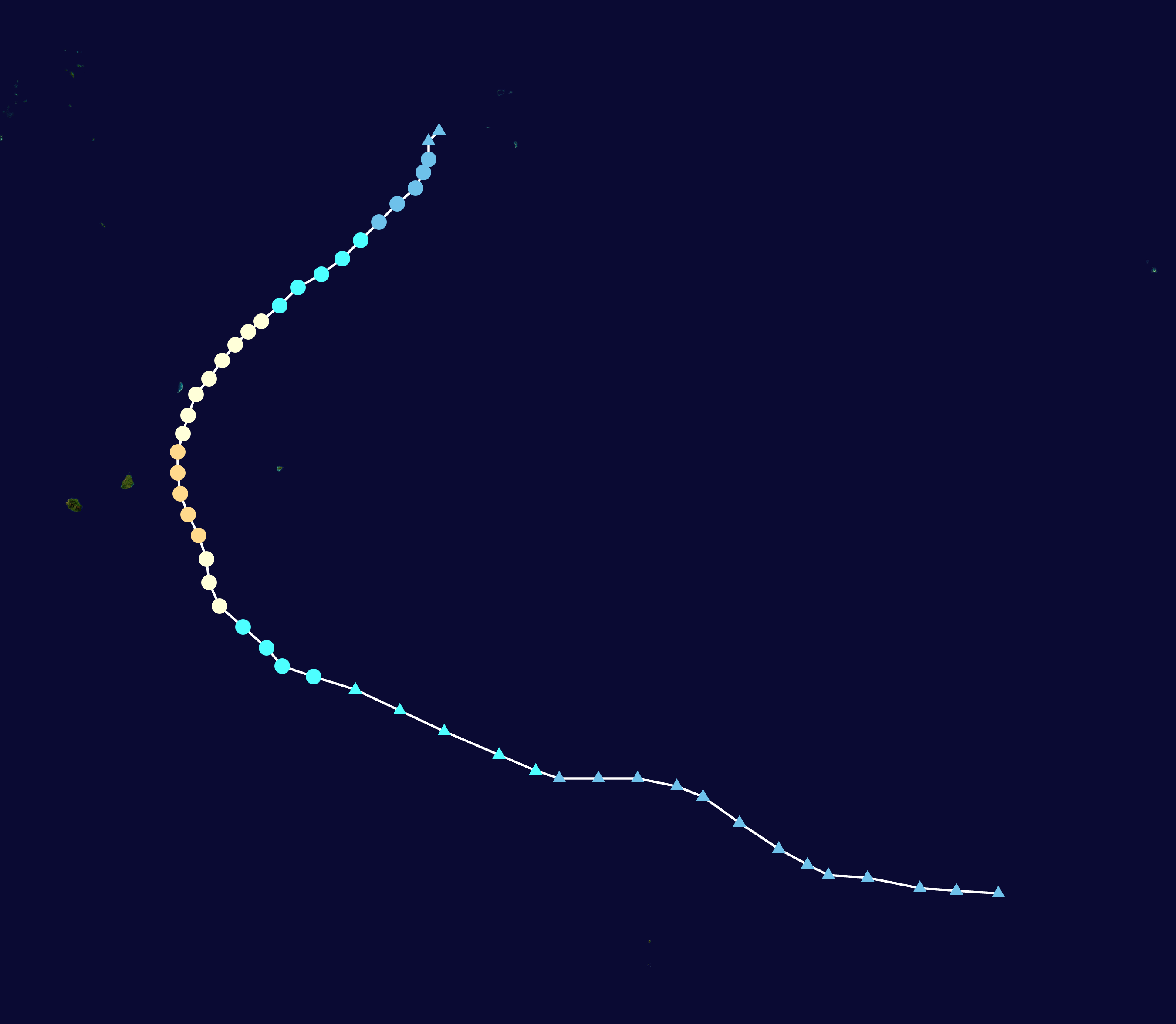
- Duration: December 21 – December 29
- Peak intensity: 150 km/h (90 mph) (10-min); 955 hPa (mbar)

For several days in mid-December, tropical cyclone forecast models anticipated a storm to form to the south-west of Diego Garcia, which was proven true when an area of convection formed in that area, becoming a tropical disturbance on December 21, the fourth of the season. On December 23, MFR upgraded the disturbance to a tropical depression, and later that day to Tropical Storm Crystal. The storm moved southwestward toward Mauritius due to a ridge to the south-east. Strengthening was gradual, and the JTWC upgraded Crystal to the equivalent of a minimal hurricane late on December 24. The next day, an eye developed, although dry air initially prevented much further intensification. MFR upgraded Crystal to tropical cyclone status on December 26, and that day the cyclone passed just east of St. Brandon. Subsequently, Crystal intensified quickly after the eye became clearer, reaching peak winds of 150 km/h (93 mph) on December 27. Around that time, the storm passed east of Mauritius as it turned to the south while rounding the ridge. After maintaining peak winds for about 18 hours, Crystal weakened, gradually undergoing extratropical transition. The convection diminished over the center, and Crystal weakened to tropical storm status on December 28. The next day, the JTWC and MFR discontinued advisories, labeling the storm as extratropical. The remnants continued to the south-east, dissipating on January 3 after crossing into the Australian region.

While passing just east of St. Brandon, Crystal produced wind gusts of 91 km/h (57 mph). The storm initially threatened to strike Mauritius, but effects were minimal due to the island being on the dry south-west quadrant of the storm. Crystal produced wind gusts of 91 km/h (57 mph). Rainfall reached 58.8 mm (2.31 in), although minimal precipitation occurred in northern Mauritius.

=== Severe Tropical Storm Delfina ===
- Severe tropical storm (MFR)
- Tropical storm (SSHWS)
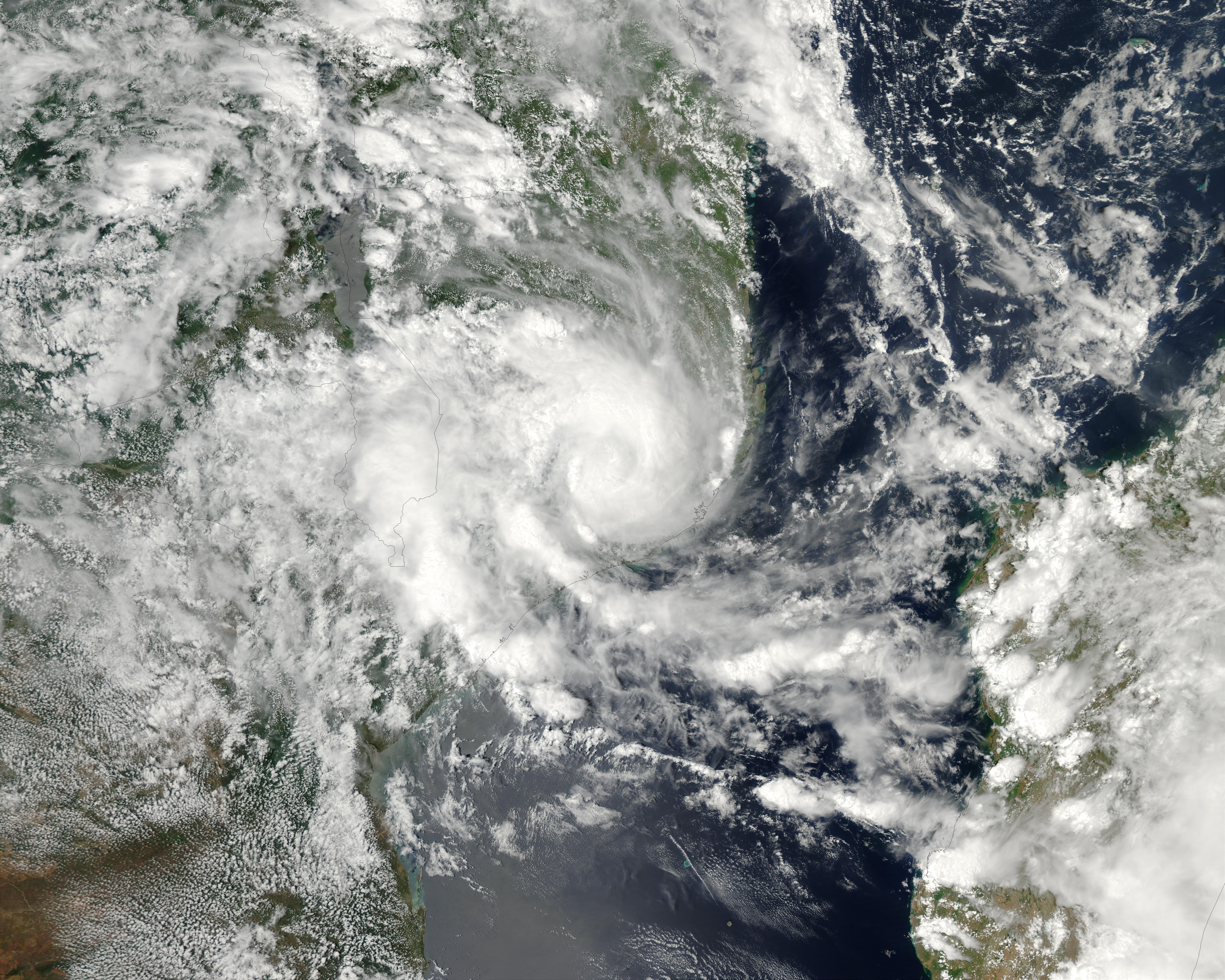
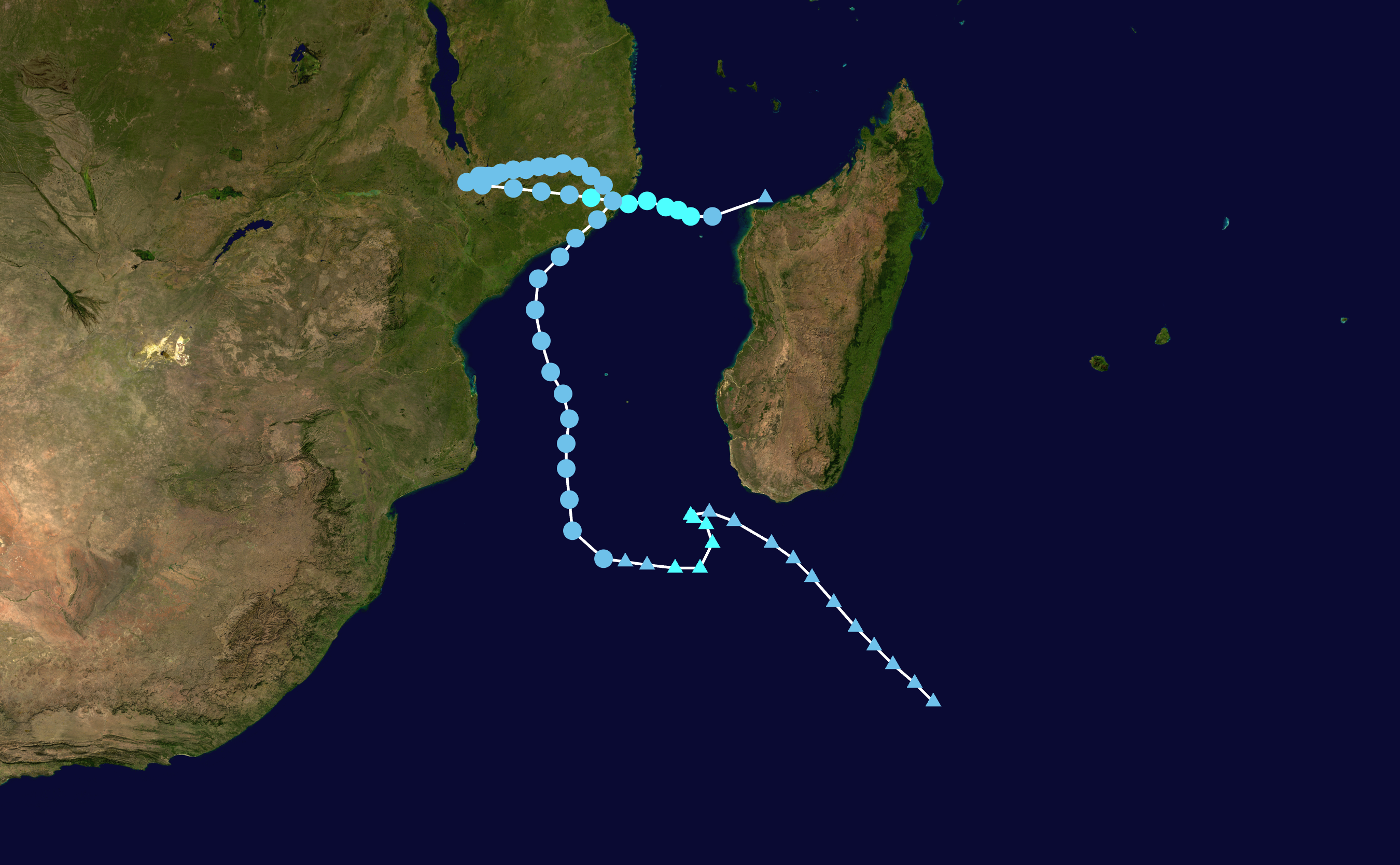
- Duration: December 30 – January 9
- Peak intensity: 95 km/h (60 mph) (10-min); 985 hPa (mbar)

In late December, a tropical disturbance rapidly formed off the north-west coast of Madagascar. By late on December 30, MFR classified it as a tropical disturbance. The system quickly intensified while moving westward, becoming a strong tropical storm before hitting north-eastern Mozambique on December 31. Delfina weakened while moving inland, and it was no longer classifiable as a tropical cyclone by January 1. However, its remnants moved across the country and into Malawi, later looping around and crossing back over Mozambique. When the remnants reached the Mozambique Channel, they were reclassified as Tropical Disturbance 07, which moved southward over waters. It re-intensified into a tropical storm on January 8 before weakening the next day, becoming extratropical. The remnants persisted for several days, dissipating on January 14.

In both Mozambique and Malawi, Delfina dropped heavy rainfall that caused flooding. In the former country, over 18,000 houses were severely damaged or destroyed, leaving thousands homeless. The storm damaged roads and bridges, which disrupted relief efforts in the aftermath, and floods destroyed widespread areas of crops in the midst of an ongoing food shortage. Lingering flooding caused an outbreak of cholera and malaria in Mozambique, and 47 people were killed by Delfina. In Malawi, flooding was not widespread, although the storm destroyed about 3,600 houses. Delfina killed eight people in the country. Only two months after the storm struck, however, Cyclone Japhet left damage and deaths in many of the same areas that Delfina affected.

=== Severe Tropical Storm Ebula ===
- Severe tropical storm (MFR)
- Category 1 tropical cyclone (SSHWS)
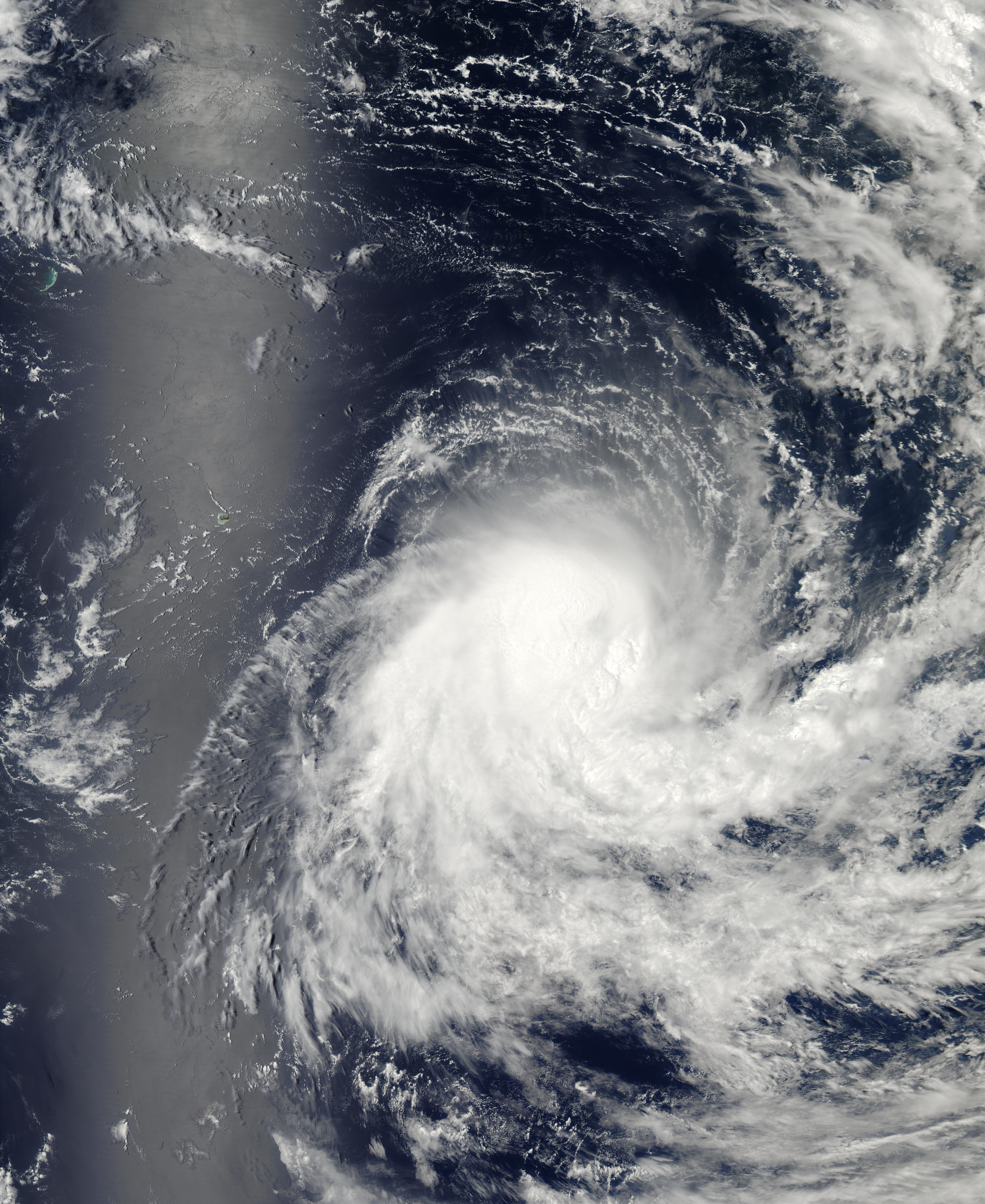
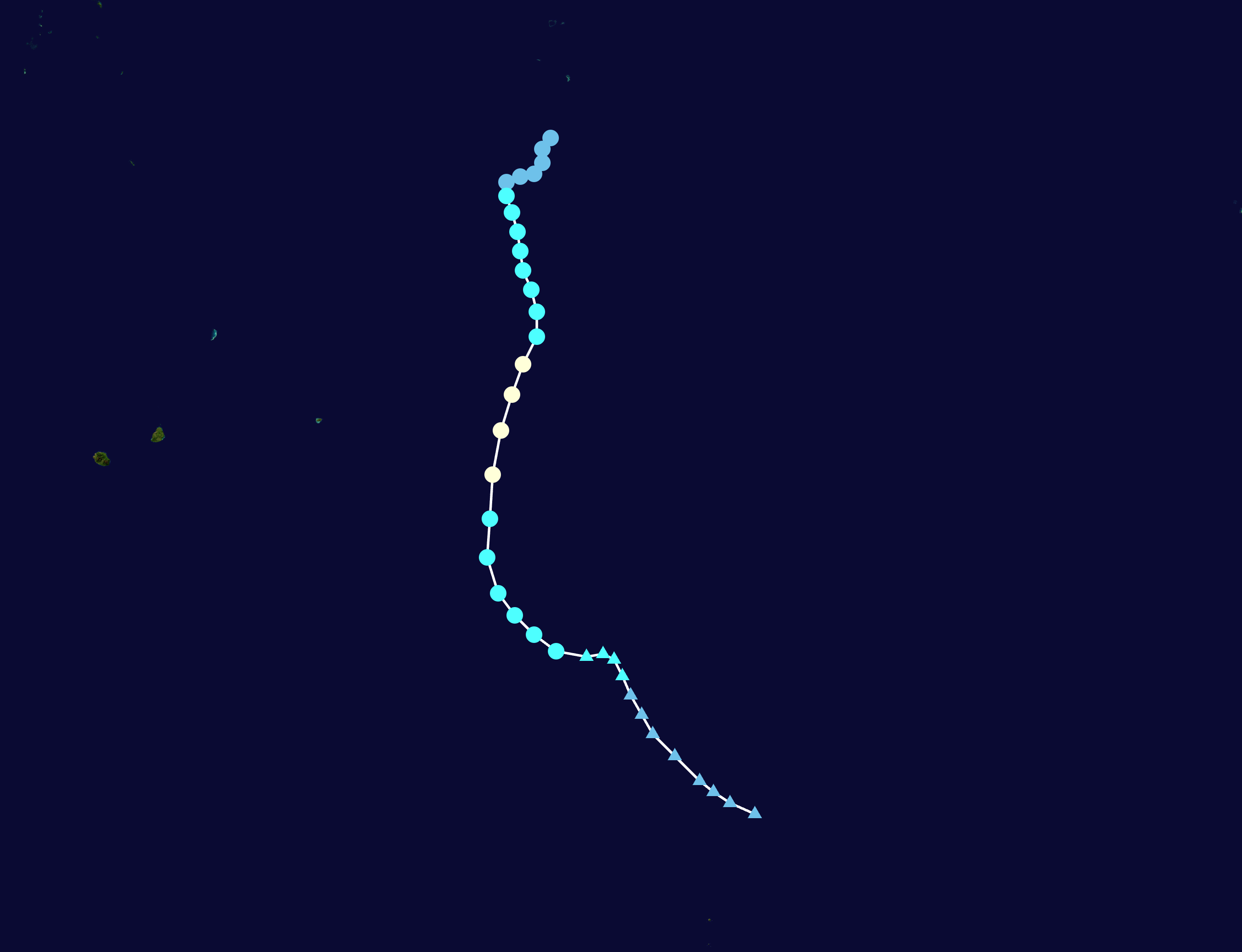
- Duration: January 7 – January 12
- Peak intensity: 110 km/h (70 mph) (10-min); 972 hPa (mbar)

An area of convection persisted on January 6 to the south-west of Diego Garcia with an associated circulation. It moved generally southward south-west within an area of generally favorable conditions, becoming Tropical Disturbance 08 on January 7. Thunderstorms increased, and the JTWC initiated advisories on Tropical Cyclone 09S early on January 8. The next day, MFR upgraded it to Tropical Storm Ebula. Outflow became more pronounced and the storm continued to intensify. On January 10, the JTWC upgraded Ebula to the equivalent of a minimal hurricane, and estimated peak winds of 115 km/h (71 mph), just shy of tropical cyclone status. Subsequently, increased wind shear imparted weakening. After having spent much of its duration moving generally southward, Ebula turned to the south-east on January 11 due to a ridge to the south moving farther east. The thunderstorms diminished, and the JTWC discontinued advisories on January 12. That day, MFR declared that Ebula became extratropical, and the remnants dissipated on January 15.

=== Severe Tropical Storm Fari ===
- Severe tropical storm (MFR)
- Tropical storm (SSHWS)
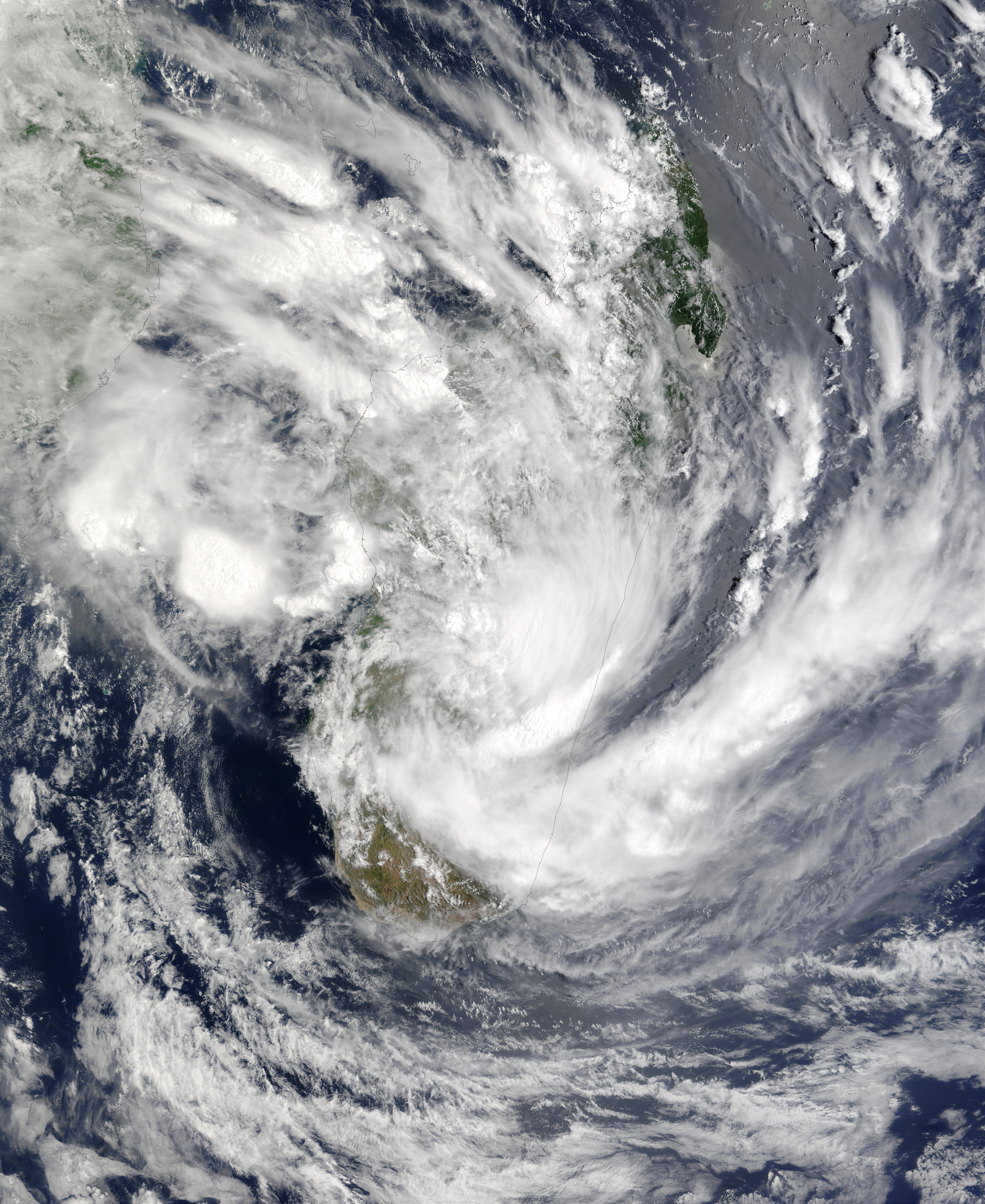
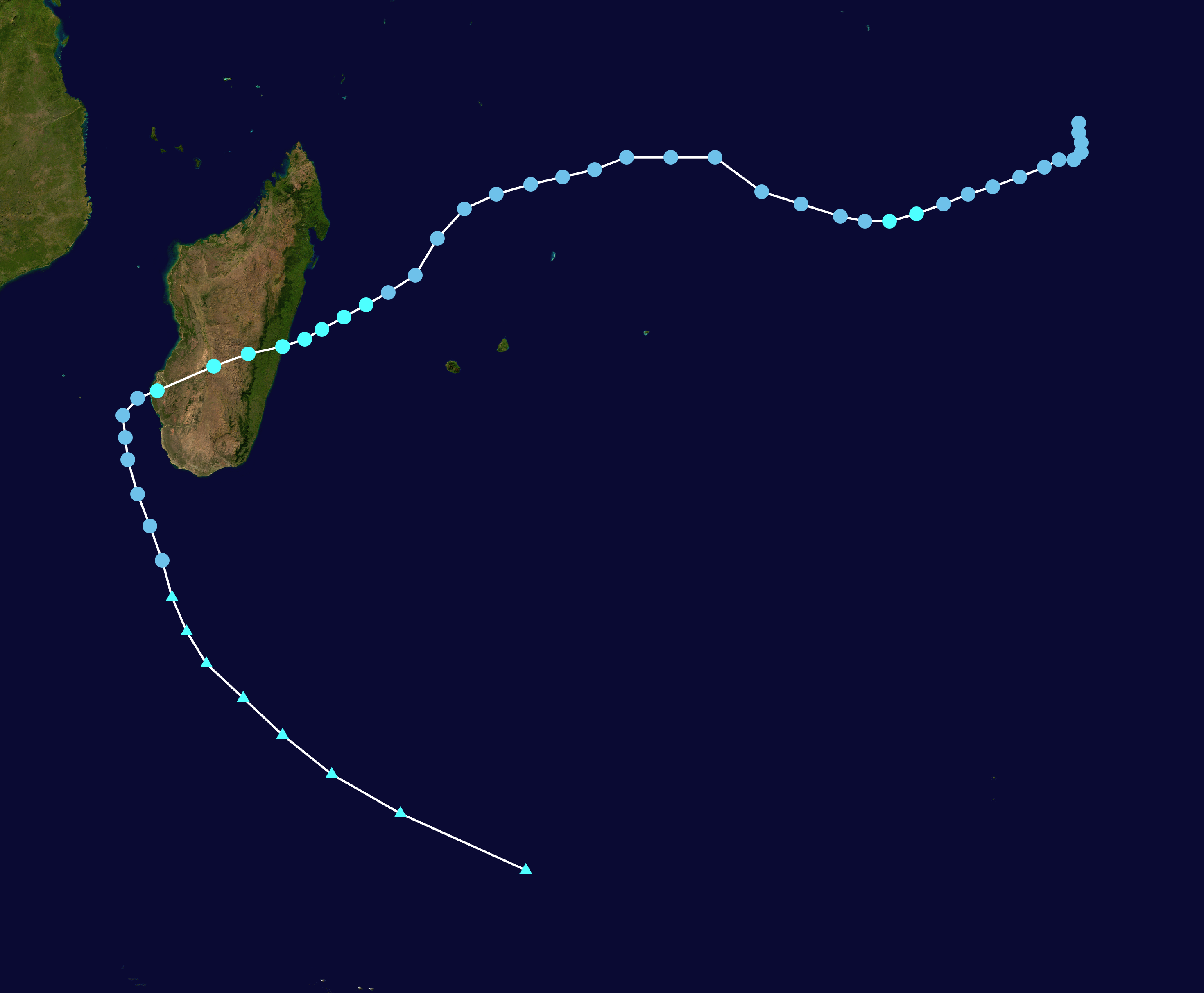
- Duration: January 24 – January 31
- Peak intensity: 95 km/h (60 mph) (10-min); 985 hPa (mbar)

An area of convection persisted on January 20 to the east-south-east of Diego Garcia, quickly developing outflow due to minimal wind shear. It moved to the south-west and its circulation became better defined. On January 23, the MFR initiated advisories on Tropical Disturbance 09, and later that day the JTWC issued a TCFA. Subsequently, the MFR upgraded the disturbance to a tropical depression and the JTWC initiated advisories on Tropical Cyclone 11S. Shortly thereafter, the system weakened and the circulation became exposed from the deep convection. The JTWC discontinued advisories on January 24, but MFR continued tracking the disturbance as it moved to the west. After reaching an area of low wind shear, thunderstorms again increased over the center, and the JTWC re-issued advisories on January 28. By that time, the system was nearing eastern Madagascar, and later that day MFR upgraded the system to Tropical Storm Fari. Early on January 29, MFR estimated peak winds of 95 km/h (59 mph), making Fari a moderate tropical storm. Shortly thereafter, the storm made landfall on Madagascar just south of Mahanoro. Fari quickly weakened into a tropical depression while crossing the country, emerging into the Mozambique Channel early on January 30. After the storm turned to the south, the MFR and JTWC declared Fari extratropical on January 31, and the remnants dissipated on February 2.

Tropical Storm Fari struck Madagascar after the country had experienced weeks of heavy rainfall, causing widespread flooding. In the area where it moved ashore, the storm flooded crop fields that damaged most of the banana and fruit trees. The storm left landslides that isolated Marolambo and caused damage in other towns. Fari left 3,400 people homeless and caused an outbreak of conjunctivitis and diarrhea.

=== Intense Tropical Cyclone Gerry ===
- Intense tropical cyclone (MFR)
- Category 3 tropical cyclone (SSHWS)
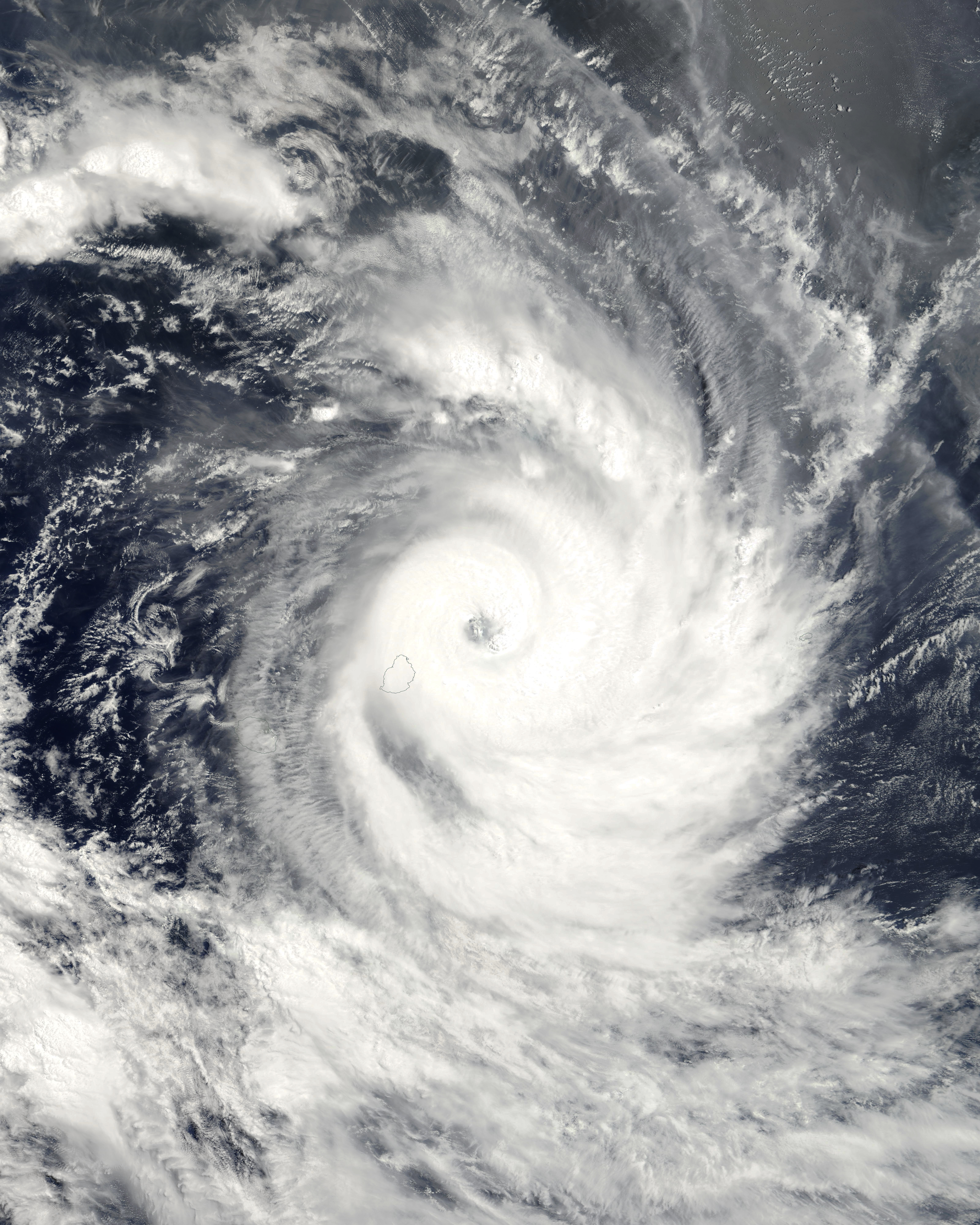
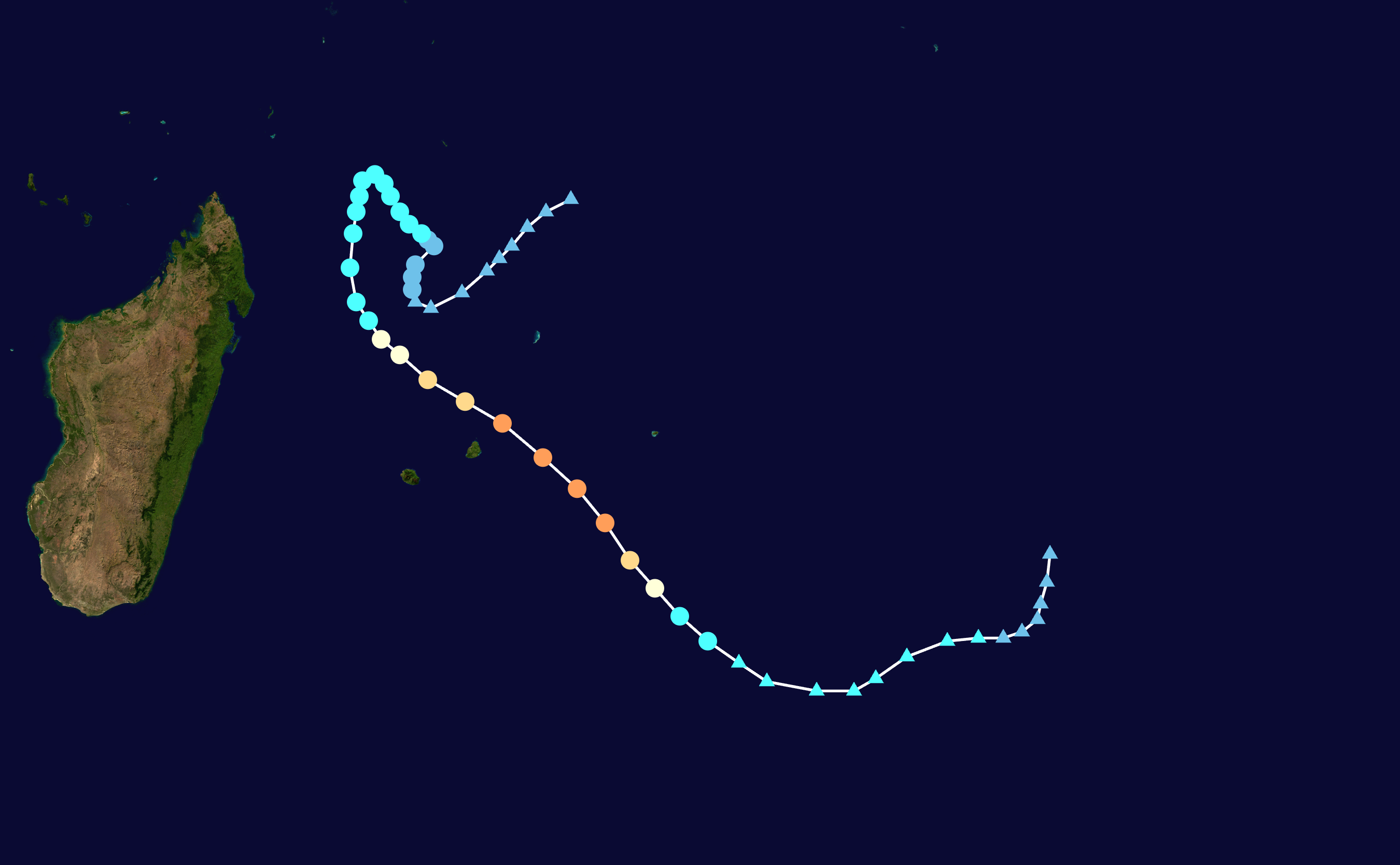
- Duration: February 5 – February 15
- Peak intensity: 165 km/h (105 mph) (10-min); 940 hPa (mbar)

On February 5, MFR began tracking a tropical disturbance to the east of Madagascar's northern coast. The system moved to the south-west before turning to the north on February 7. By that day, the system had persistent convection around a weak circulation, located in an area of low wind shear. On February 8, the JTWC initiated advisories on Tropical Cyclone 16S, although initially the circulation was broad and exposed from the thunderstorms. The next day, MFR upgraded the depression to tropical storm status, and the Meteorological Services of Mauritius named the system Gerry. The storm turned to the south toward Mauritius and steadily intensified. On February 12, the JTWC upgraded Gerry to the equivalent of a minimal hurricane, and shortly thereafter MFR upgraded the storm to a tropical cyclone. Around that time, Gerry began undergoing rapid deepening, becoming an intense tropical cyclone early on February 13 while developing a well-defined eye and outflow. That day, the cyclone passed about 120 km (75 mi) east of Mauritius. At that time, the JTWC estimated peak 1 minute winds of 195 km/h (121 mph), and MFR estimated peak 10 minute winds of 165 km/h (103 mph). Subsequently, Gerry began weakening due to increasing wind shear, with the eye becoming disorganized. Later, the convection separated from the deepest convection, and the cyclone weakened to tropical storm status on February 14. The next day, JTWC discontinued advisories, and on February 16 MFR declared Jerry extratropical. The remnants dissipated two days later.

Early in its duration, Gerry passed just west of Tromelin Island, producing tropical storm force winds and gusts to 111 km/h (69 mph). The cyclone originally threatened to strike Mauritius directly, but due to a more east-south-easterly motion, Gerry passed more to the east. The storm forced the closure of Sir Seewoosagur Ramgoolam International Airport, along with schools and government offices. Wind gusts on Mauritius reached 144 km/h (89 mph). Gerry dropped heavy rainfall, peaking at 139.2 mm (5.48 in) at Mare aux Vacoas, and it produced high waves along the northern coast. One person was killed who was electrocuted during the storm's passage.

=== Tropical Cyclone Hape ===
- Tropical cyclone (MFR)
- Category 2 tropical cyclone (SSHWS)
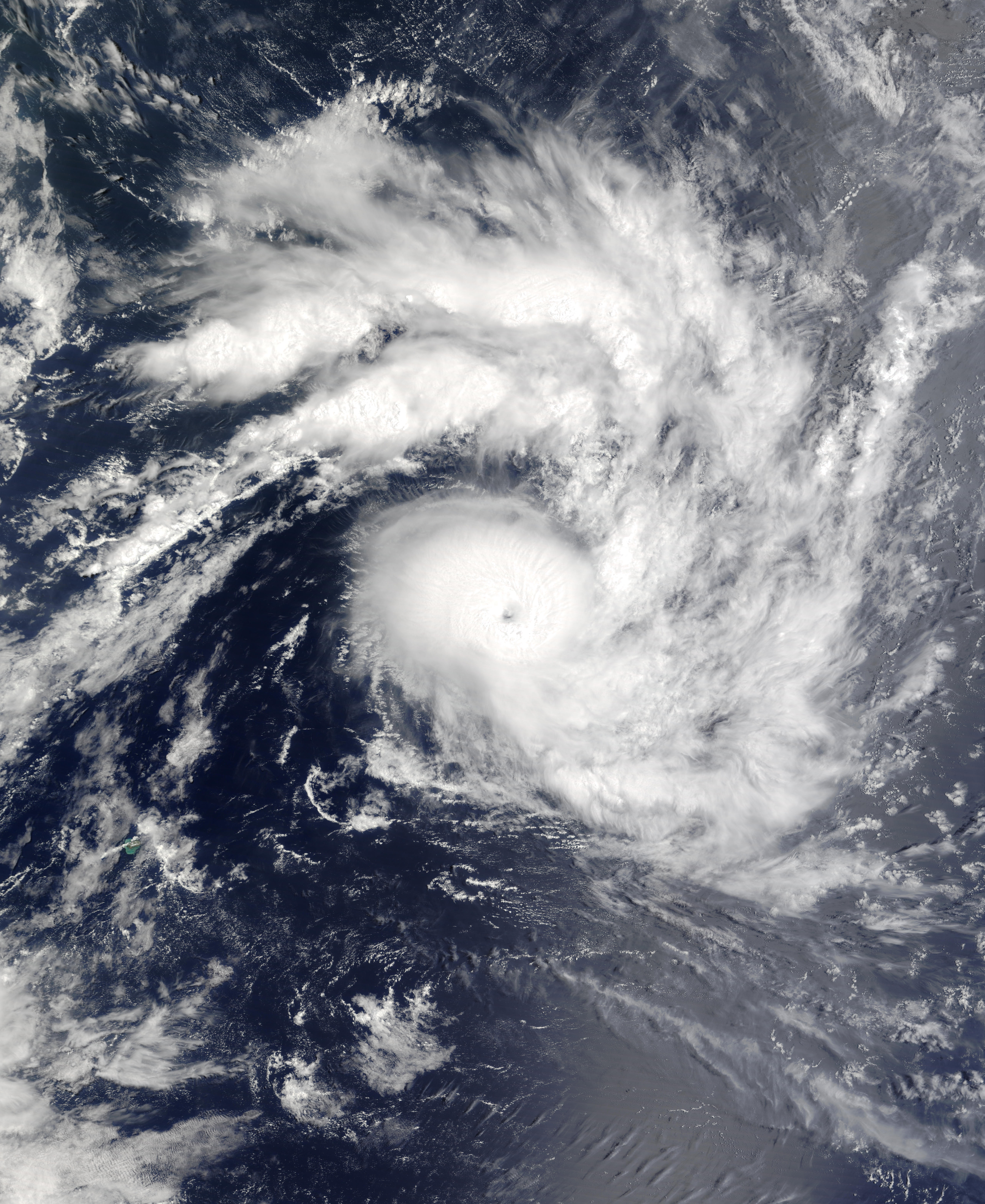
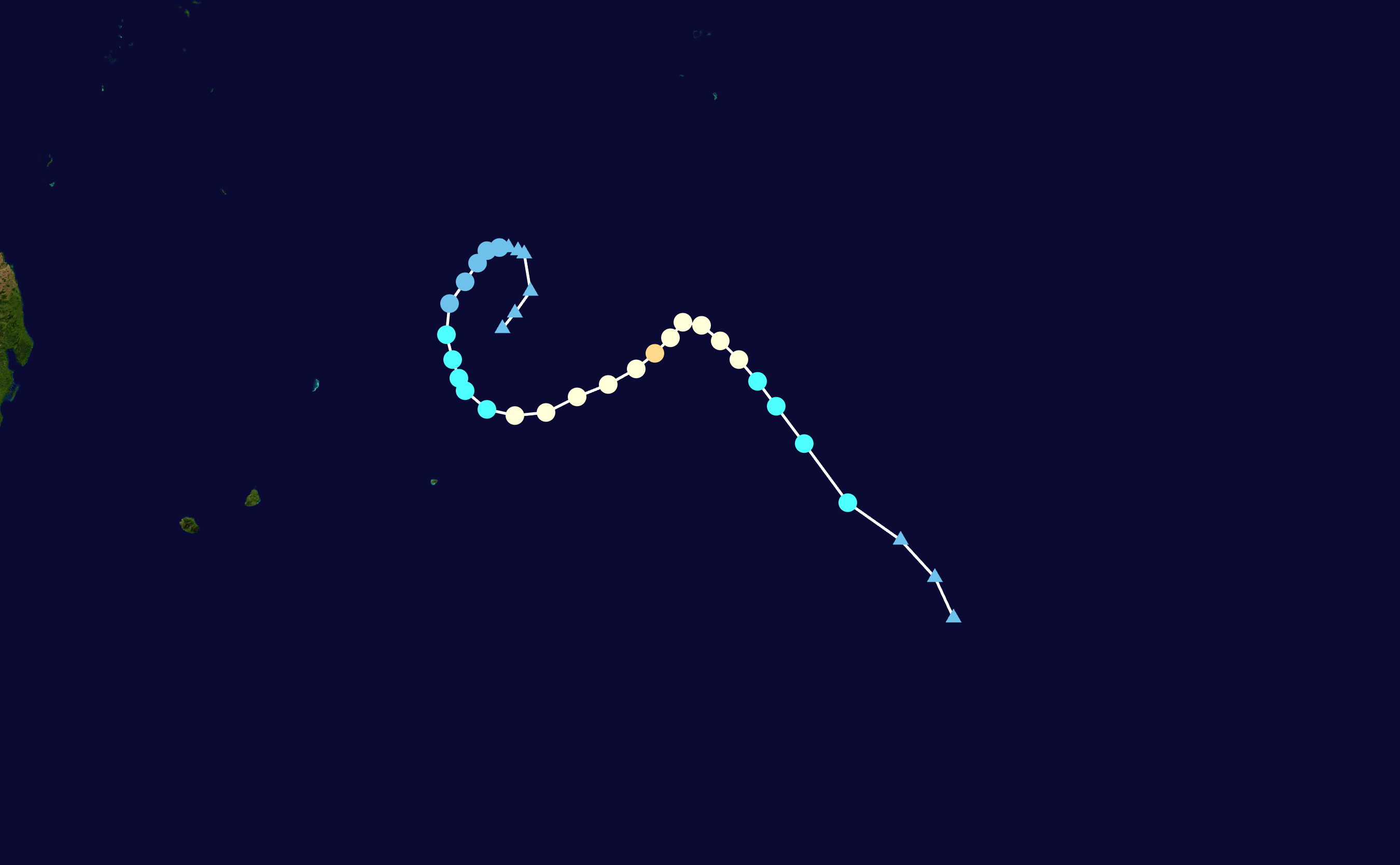
- Duration: February 7 – February 16
- Peak intensity: 150 km/h (90 mph) (10-min); 960 hPa (mbar)

Around the same time that Tropical Storm Gerry was developing, another area of convection to its east was organizing. On February 7, the system became a tropical disturbance, and initially moved to the north. Operationally, MFR first began issuing advisories on February 9 for Tropical Disturbance 11, when the system had a small center and accompanying convection. By that time, the disturbance had turned to the south, and favorable conditions allowed for gradual development. MFR upgraded the system to tropical storm status late on February 9, although the system was not named Hape until 36 hours later. On February 10, the JTWC initiated advisories on Tropical Cyclone 17S. An eye developed on February 11, suggesting quick intensification. At 1800 UTC that day, the JTWC and MFR upgraded Hape to the equivalent of a minimal hurricane and to tropical cyclone status, respectively. By that time, the cyclone had turned to the east-north-east due to a weakness in a ridge to the north. MFR estimated that Hape reached peak 10-minute winds of 150 km/h (93 mph) on February 12, and the next day the JTWC estimated 1-minute winds of 165 km/h (103 mph). Later, the storm weakened, and it turned to the south-east when the ridge re-intensified. Outflow decreased due to interaction with Cyclone Gerry to the west, and Hape weakened to tropical storm status on February 13. On February 15, the JTWC discontinued advisories once the circulation was exposed from the deep convection. The next day, MFR followed suit after the circulation dissipated.

=== Moderate Tropical Storm Isha ===
- Moderate tropical storm (MFR)
- Tropical storm (SSHWS)
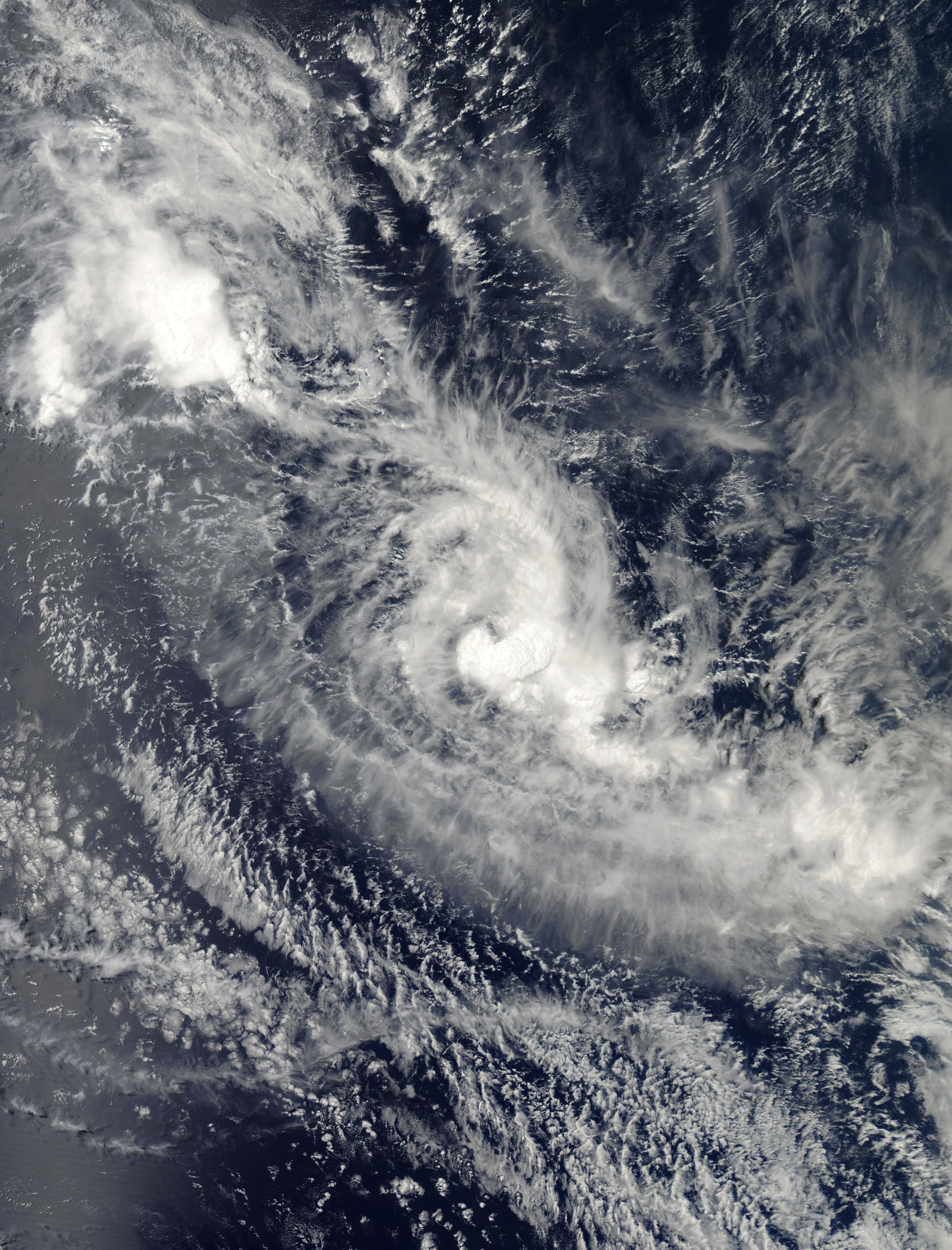
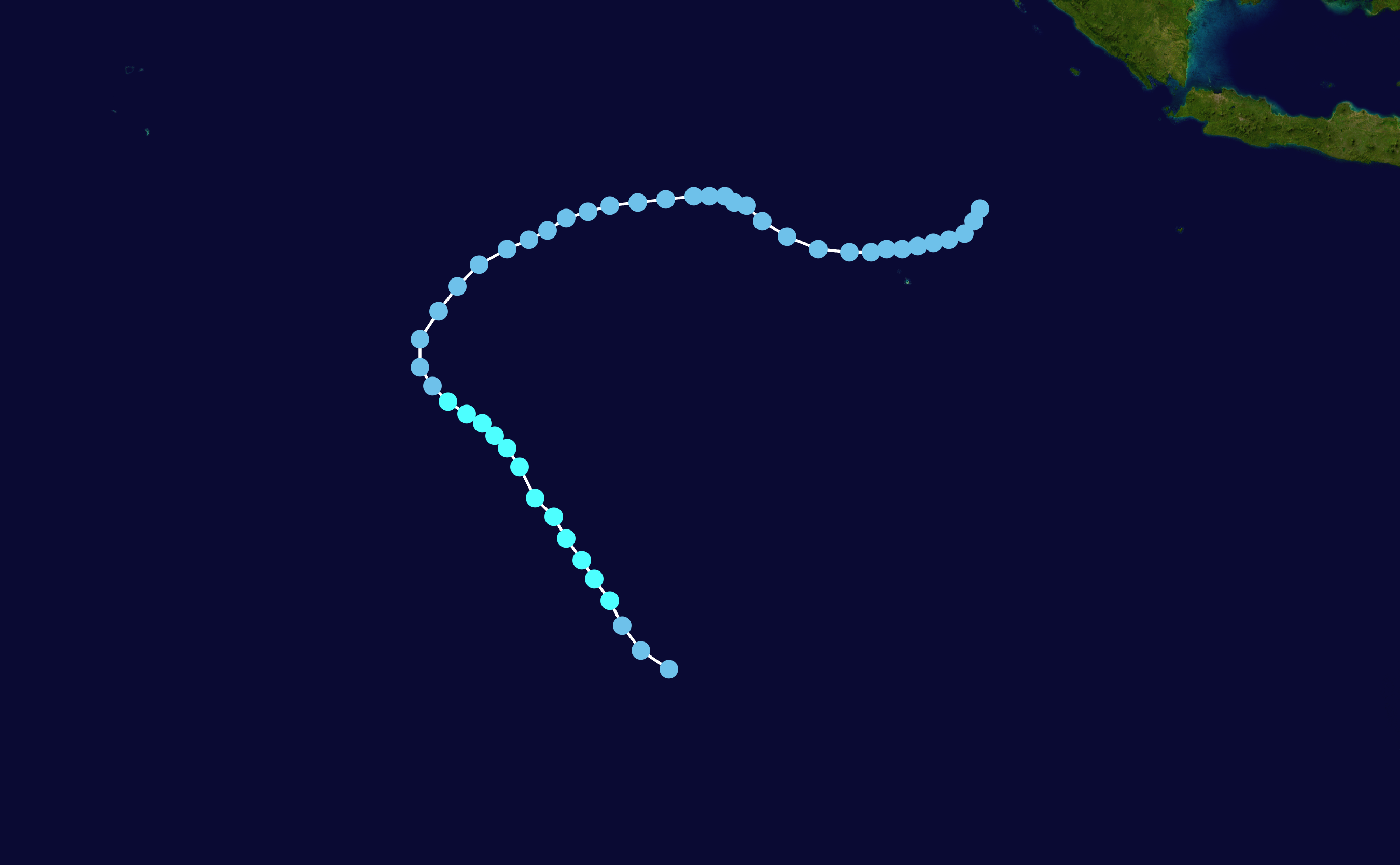
- Duration: February 9 (entered basin) – February 15
- Peak intensity: 65 km/h (40 mph) (10-min); 995 hPa (mbar)

Widespread convection in the monsoon trough persisted across the south-eastern Indian Ocean in early February. One area was tracked by the JTWC on February 3 in the Australian basin, south-west of Indonesia. The system moved westward without development, crossing into the basin on February 8. The next day, MFR began tracking the system as a tropical disturbance. On February 11, the system turned to the south-east, due to a ridge to the north. That day, JTWC started issuing advisories on Tropical Cyclone 18S. Initially, the storm failed to intensify much due to a nearby upper-level ridge. On February 12, MFR upgraded the system to a tropical storm, and the next day the system was named Isha. Outflow became more pronounced due to minimal wind shear. The JTWC briefly estimated peak 1 minute winds of 85 km/h (53 mph), but the MFR never estimated winds above 65 km/h (40 mph). Isha weakened late on February 13 due to cooler waters, dry air, and stronger shear. On February 14, the JTWC discontinued advisories once there was little convection left, and the MFR estimated Isha dissipated the next day.

=== Intense Tropical Cyclone Japhet ===
- Intense tropical cyclone (MFR)
- Category 4 tropical cyclone (SSHWS)
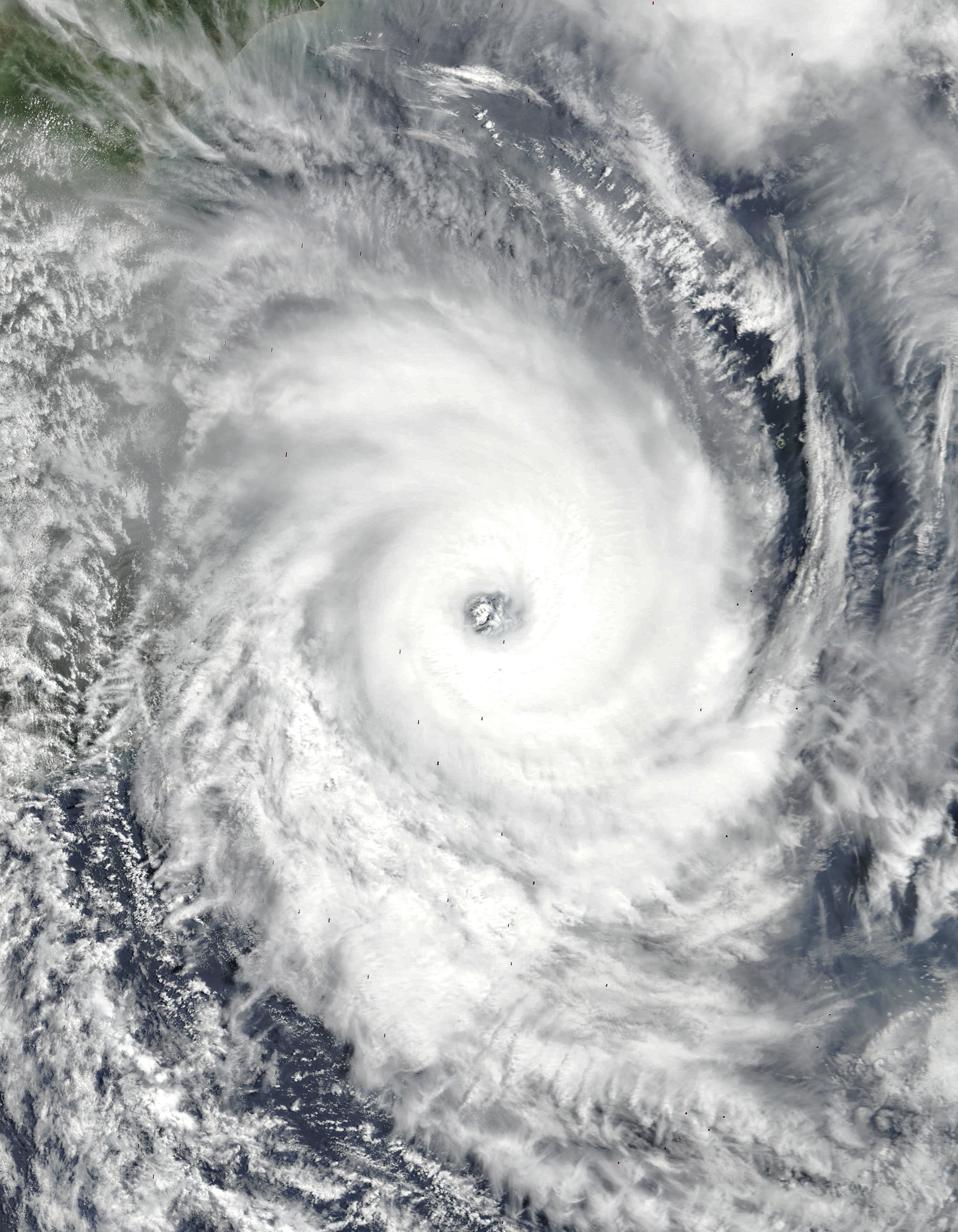
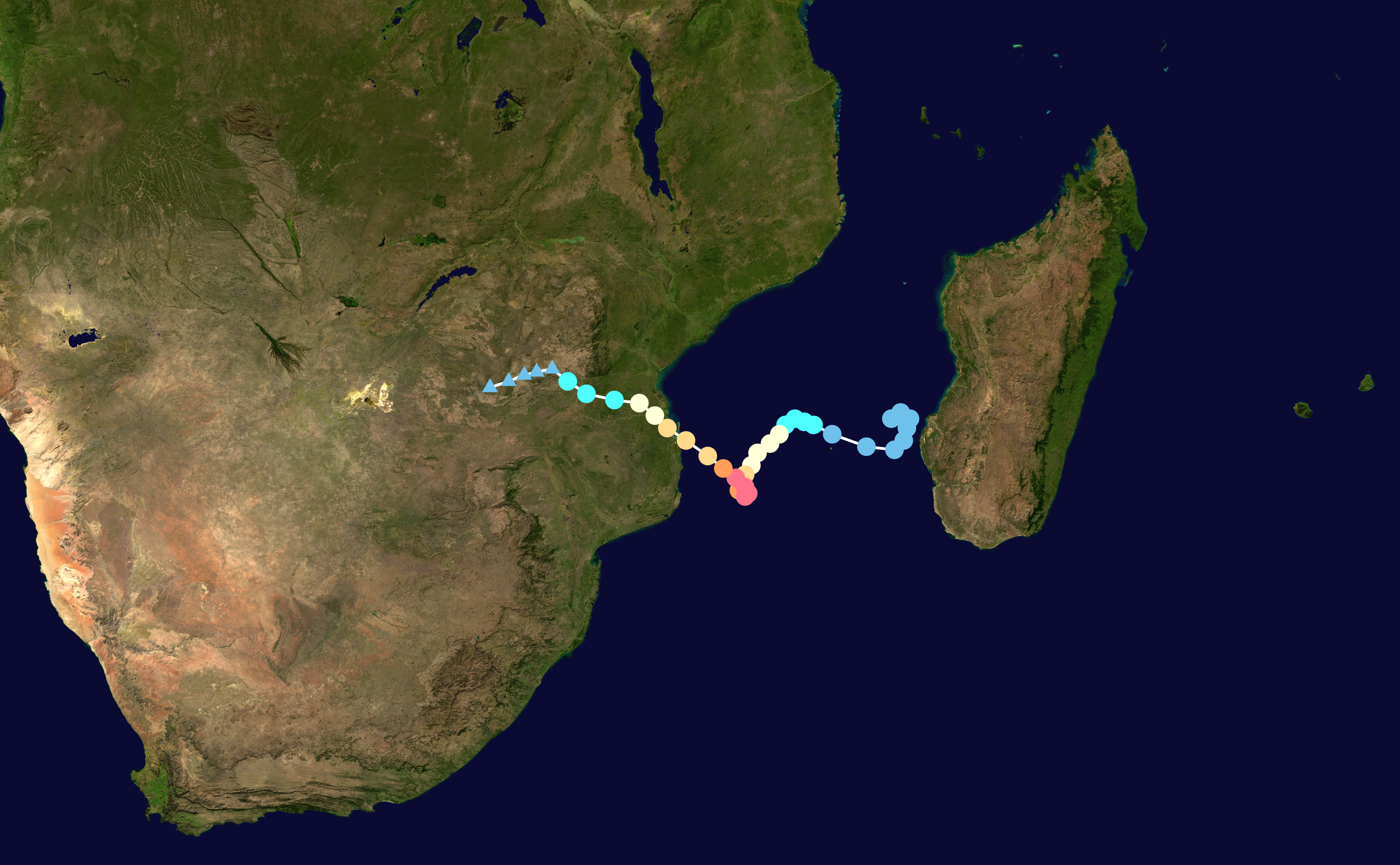
- Duration: February 25 – March 5
- Peak intensity: 175 km/h (110 mph) (10-min); 935 hPa (mbar)

Cyclone Japhet developed on February 25 near the south-west coast of Madagascar, and initially moved to the north-west before turning to the southwest. With favorable conditions for development, Japhet quickly intensified in the Mozambique Channel, reaching maximum winds of 175 km/h (109 mph), sustained over 10 minutes. This made it an intense tropical cyclone, only the sixth to occur in the channel in 24 years. After stalling briefly, the cyclone turned to the northwest, weakening slightly before striking Mozambique just south of Vilankulo on March 2. Japhet slowly weakened while progressing inland, dissipating over Zambia on March 6.

Along its path, Japhet dropped heavy rainfall that caused widespread river flooding. The rains occurred after an extended drought, although excessive precipitation caused heavy crop damage, notably around where the storm moved ashore. In two provinces in Mozambique, the cyclone damaged or destroyed 25,000 houses, leaving at least 23,000 people homeless. Flooding in Zambia caused rivers to rise in Mozambique several days after the storm's passage. There were 17 deaths in Mozambique. Further inland, remnant rainfall destroyed a bridge and several houses in Zimbabwe, killing eight people.

=== Intense Tropical Cyclone Kalunde ===
- Intense tropical cyclone (MFR)
- Category 5 tropical cyclone (SSHWS)
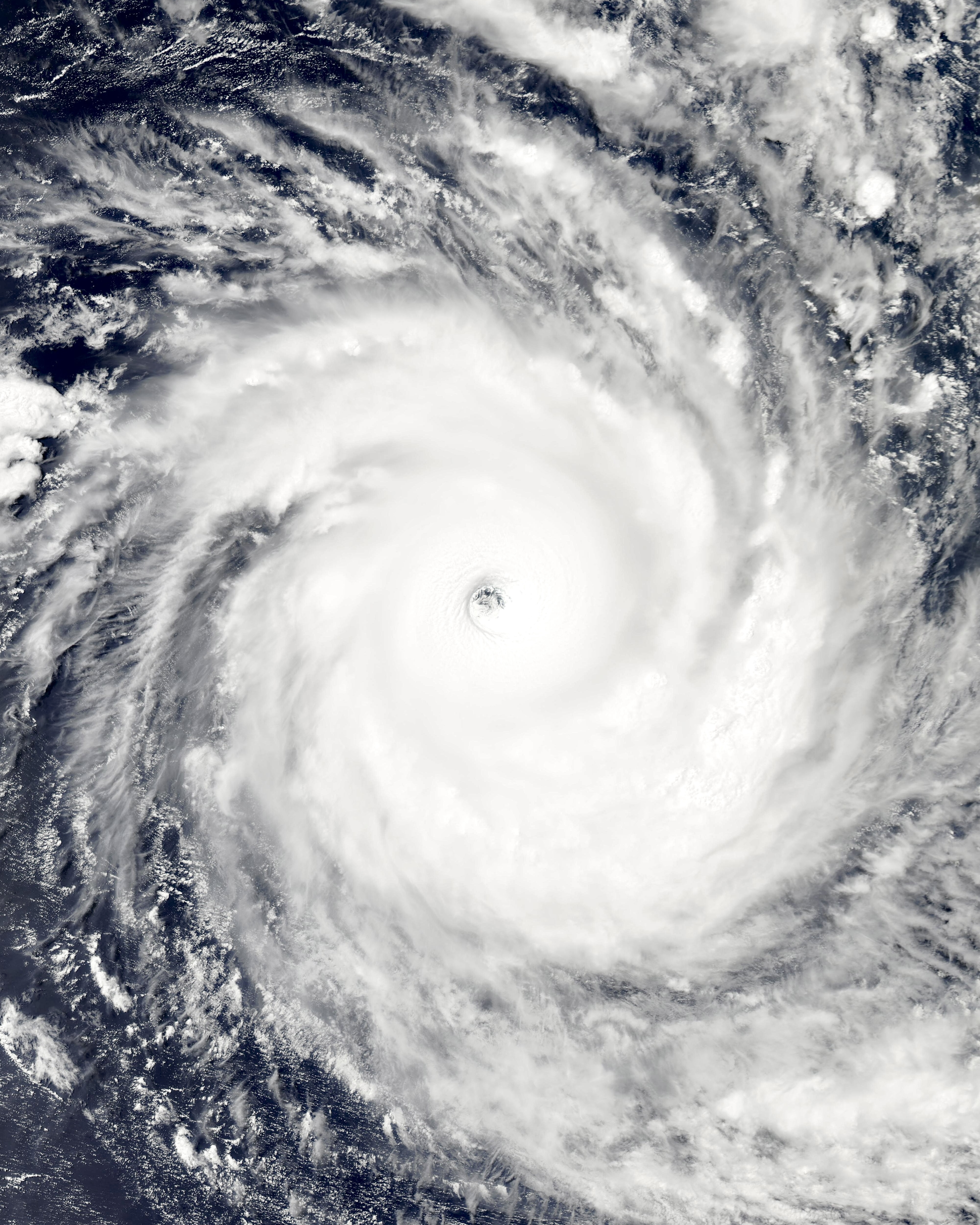
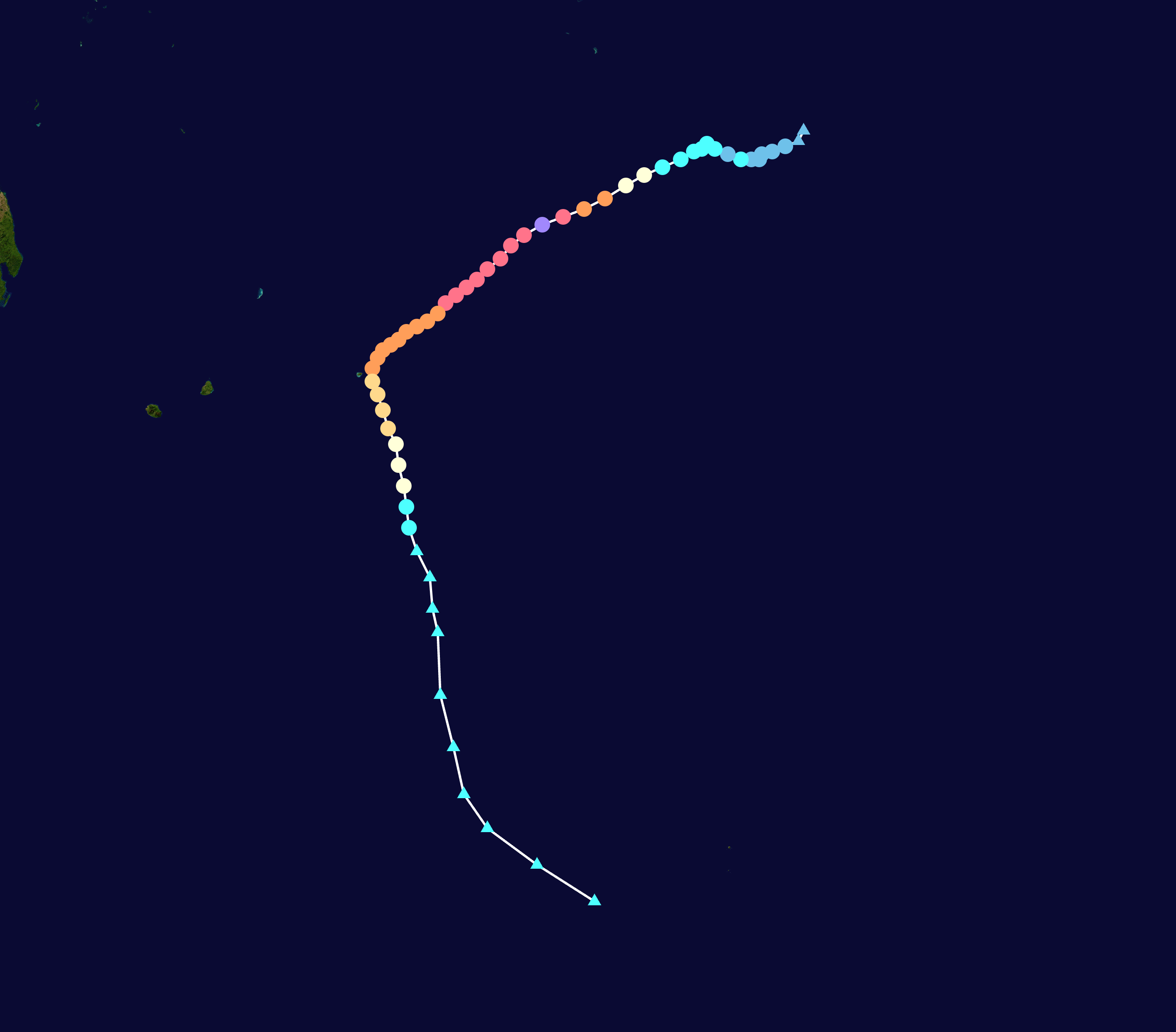
- Duration: March 3 – March 14
- Peak intensity: 215 km/h (130 mph) (10-min); 910 hPa (mbar)

Kalunde formed on March 3 from an area of convection south-east of Diego Garcia. The system slowly intensified while drifting to the west, becoming a moderate tropical storm on March 5. Its intensification rate increased as it began a steady south-west movement. Kalunde underwent rapid deepening and developed an eye, reaching peak intensity on March 8. Around that time, MFR estimated a minimum pressure of 910 mbar (910 hPa) with winds of 215 km/h (134 mph), and the JTWC estimated peak winds of 260 km/h (160 mph); this made Kalunde the strongest cyclone of the year in the basin. It weakened after undergoing an eyewall replacement cycle, and on March 12 Kalunde passed near Rodrigues island as a weakening cyclone. Around that time, the storm turned to the south, weakening to a tropical storm on March 14 before becoming extratropical the next day. The remnants of Kalunde dissipated on March 16.

When the cyclone passed Rodrigues, it produced wind gusts estimated up to 210 km/h (130 mph), which caused an island-wide power outage. Many roads were washed out, and about 80 percent of the drinking water was contaminated. During the storm's three-day passage of the island, a total of 329.1 mm (12.96 in) of rain fell. A total of 1,600 homes were damaged, and total losses across the island amounted to $3.15 million (2003 USD, €3.4 million).

=== Subtropical Depression Luma ===
- Subtropical depression (MFR)
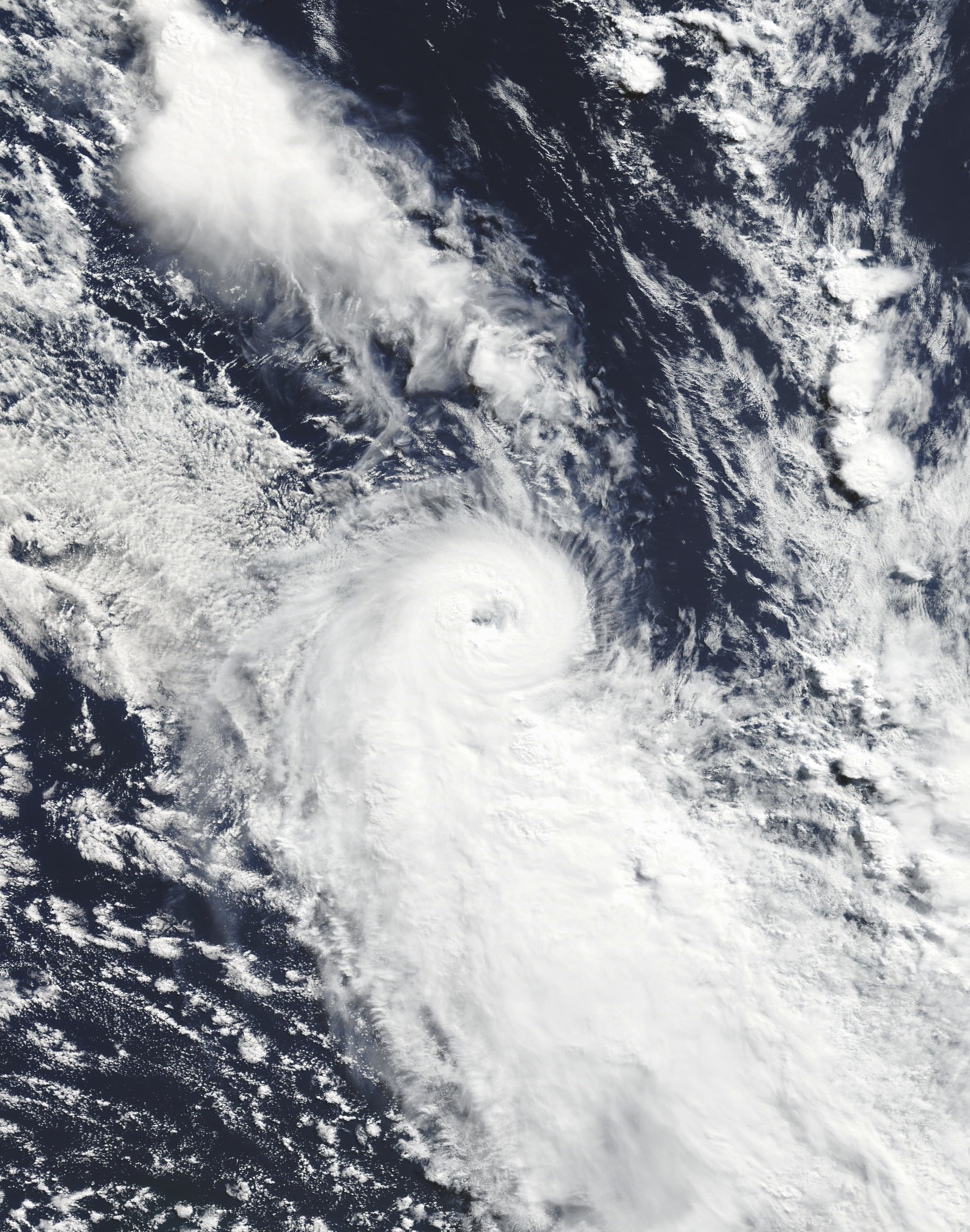
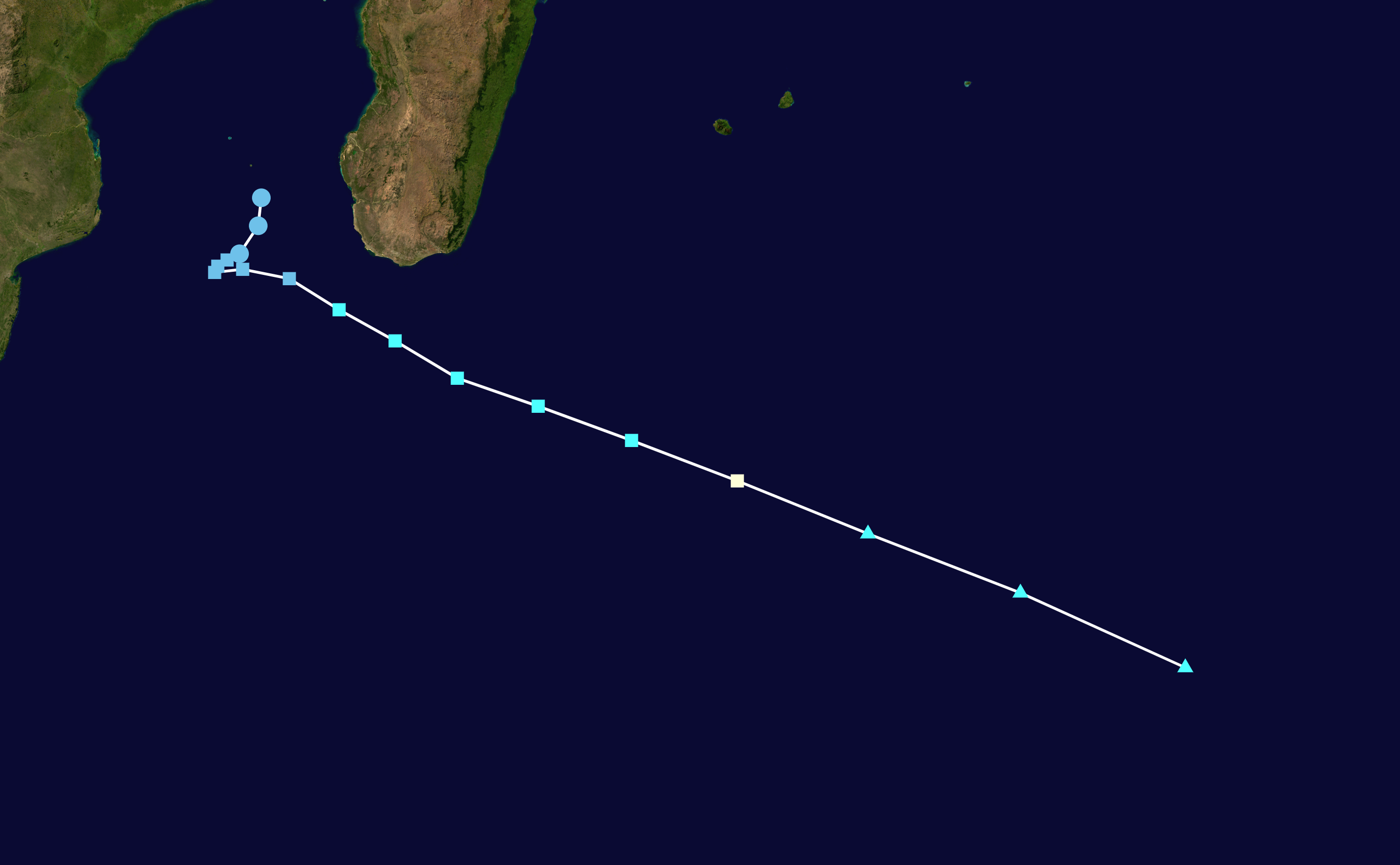
- Duration: April 8 – April 11
- Peak intensity: 130 km/h (80 mph) (10-min); 980 hPa (mbar)

A large low-level circulation persisted off the south-west coast of Madagascar on April 6. On April 8, it became a subtropical depression according to MFR, and moved to the south-west before turning sharply to the south-east. That day, the JTWC briefly assessed a fair potential for development. The circulation became exposed on April 9, but when it began quickly intensifying the next day, MFR initiated advisories on Subtropical Depression Luma. By that time, the JTWC classified the system as extratropical; however, the system developed convection near the center and became more of a tropical cyclone. On April 11, Luma developed an eye in the center of the thunderstorms, prompting MFR to upgrade the storm to peak winds of 130 km/h (81 mph). At that time, the storm was in an area of weak wind shear, although increasing shear caused rapid weakening and for the eye to dissipate. Early on April 12, Luma became extratropical as it merged with an approaching cold front.

=== Tropical Cyclone Manou ===
- Tropical cyclone (MFR)
- Category 1 tropical cyclone (SSHWS)
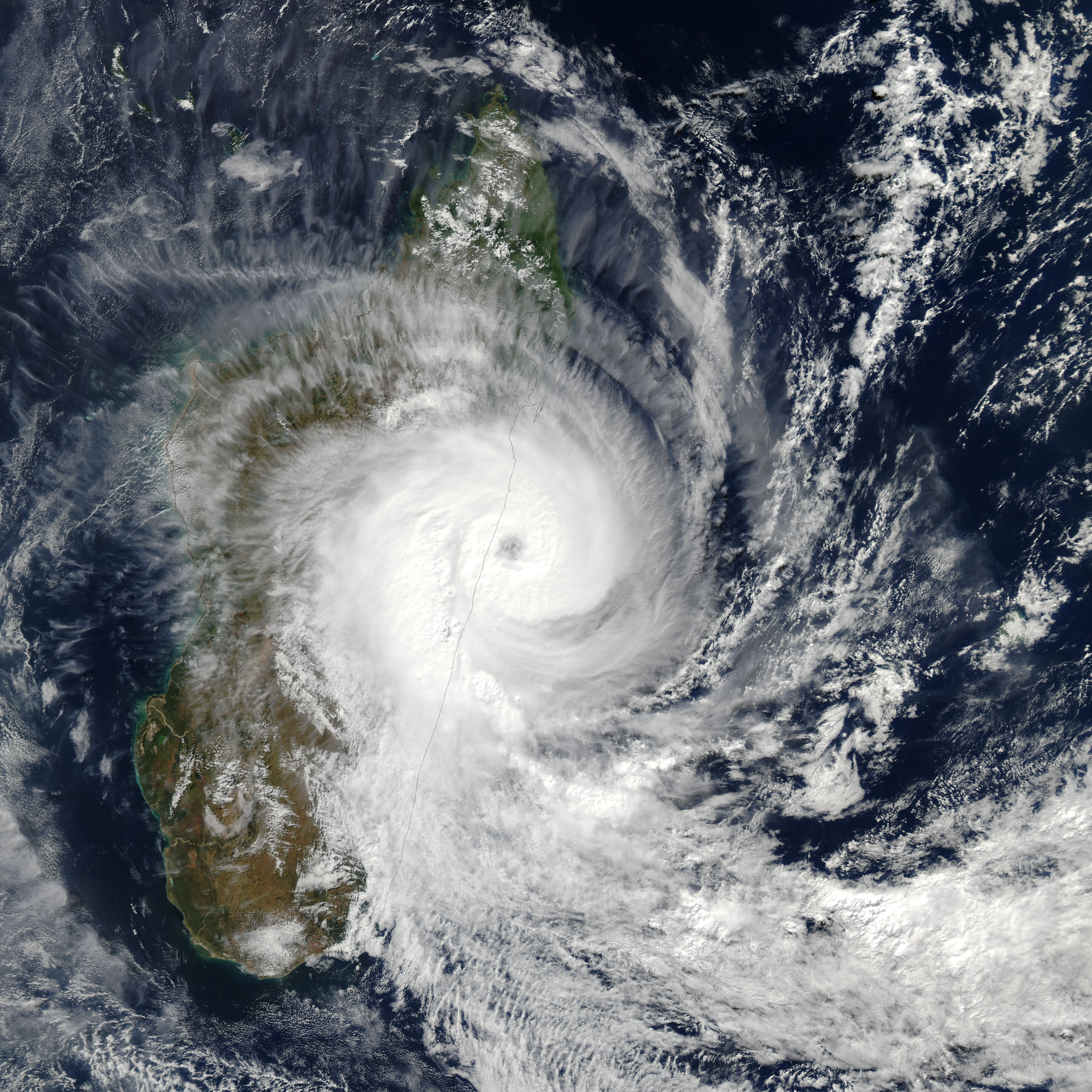
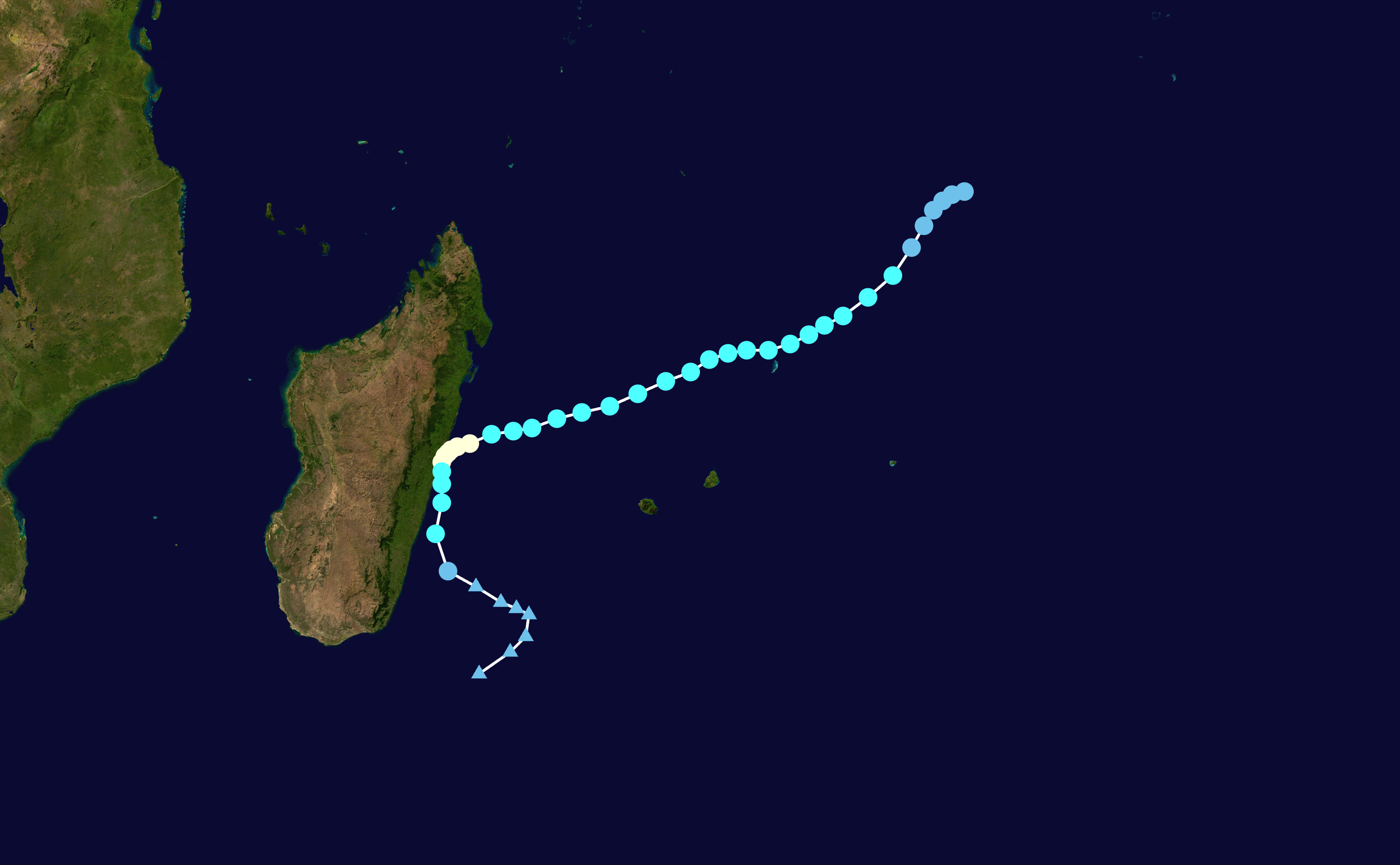
- Duration: May 2 – May 10
- Peak intensity: 155 km/h (100 mph) (10-min); 950 hPa (mbar)

Late in the season in April, an area of convection formed south-west of Diego Garcia. It gradually organized, and there was a companion system to the west that also showed signs of development. The eastern system was declared Tropical Disturbance 16 on May 2, and with a ridge to the south-east it moved generally to the southwest. Early in its duration, the system affected St. Brandon and Mauritius with gusty winds. On May 4 it intensified into Tropical Storm Manou on May 4. After an initial strengthening phase, the storm weakened but later re-intensified as it approached Madagascar. Manou developed a well-defined eye and reached peak winds only 19 km (12 mi) from the eastern Madagascar coastline. It reached tropical cyclone status, at the time only one of six in the month since 1968. For about 12 hours, the cyclone stalled before turning to the south and weakening. After becoming extratropical on May 10, Manou dissipated three days later.

Manou struck Madagascar a year after Cyclone Kesiny hit the country in May 2002, representing the first known occurrence of May tropical cyclone impacts in consecutive years. When Manou struck Madagascar, it produced gusts as strong as 211 km/h (131 mph) and heavy rainfall reaching 227 mm (8.9 in) in a 15‑hour period, both at Vatomandry. Damage in the country was heaviest there, where 85% of buildings were destroyed and 23 people were killed. Manou destroyed about 24,500 houses nationwide, leaving 114,480 people homeless. The storm destroyed large areas of crops and disrupted transportation, including damaging the road between Vatomandry and Brickaville. Manou injured 85 and killed 89 people throughout Madagascar.

== Storm names ==
A tropical disturbance is named when it reaches moderate tropical storm strength. If a tropical disturbance reaches moderate tropical storm status west of 55°E, then the Sub-regional Tropical Cyclone Advisory Centre in Madagascar assigns the appropriate name to the storm. If a tropical disturbance reaches moderate tropical storm status between 55°E and 90°E, then the Sub-regional Tropical Cyclone Advisory Centre in Mauritius assigns the appropriate name to the storm. A new annual list is used every year so no names are retired.

- Atang
- Boura
- Crystal
- Delfina
- Ebula
- Fari
- Gerry
- Hape
- Isha
- Japhet
- Kalunde
- Luma
- Manou
- Noe (unused)
- Opanga (unused)
- Pale (unused)
- Qacha (unused)
- Rita (unused)
- Serame (unused)
- Tina (unused)
- Ulysse (unused)
- Vicente (unused)
- Winston (unused)
- Xena (unused)
- Yve (unused)
- Zaitoune (unused)

== Season effects ==
This table lists all of the tropical cyclones and subtropical cyclones that were monitored during the 2002–2003 South-West Indian Ocean cyclone season. Information on their intensity, duration, name, areas affected, primarily comes from RSMC La Reunion. Death and damage reports come from either press reports or the relevant national disaster management agency while the damage totals are given in 2003 USD.

Name	Dates	Peak intensity			Areas affected	Damage (USD)	Deaths	Ref(s).
Name	Dates	Category	Wind speed	Pressure	Areas affected	Damage (USD)	Deaths	Ref(s).
One	September 5–8	Moderate tropical storm	65 km/h (40 mph)	1,003 hPa (29.6186 inHg)	Seychelles	$50,000	None	
Atang	November 4–13	Tropical depression	55 km/h (34 mph)	997 hPa (29.4414 inHg)	Madagascar, Mozambique, Tanzania	None	Unconfirmed	
Boura	November 14–27	Tropical cyclone	130 km/h (81 mph)	965 hPa (28.4964 inHg)	None	None	None	
Crystal	December 21–29	Tropical cyclone	150 km/h (93 mph)	955 hPa (28.2011 inHg)	Mauritius	Minimal	None	
Five	December 25–27	Tropical depression	55 km/h (34 mph)	998 hPa (29.4709 inHg)	Madagascar, Mozambique, Tanzania	None	None	
Delfina	December 30 – January 9	Severe tropical storm	95 km/h (59 mph)	985 hPa (29.0870 inHg)	Mozambique, Tanzania, Malawi	$3.5 million	54	
Ebula	January 7–12	Severe tropical storm	115 km/h (71 mph)	972 hPa (28.7031 inHg)	None	None	None	
Fari	January 24–31	Severe tropical storm	95 km/h (59 mph)	985 hPa (29.0870 inHg)	Madagascar	Unknown	None	
Gerry	February 5–15	Intense tropical cyclone	165 km/h (103 mph)	940 hPa (27.7582 inHg)	Mauritius, Réunion	Unknown	1	
Hape	February 7–16	Tropical cyclone	150 km/h (93 mph)	960 hPa (28.3488 inHg)	None	None	None	
Isha	February 9–15	Moderate tropical storm	65 km/h (40 mph)	995 hPa (29.3823 inHg)	None	None	None	
Japhet	February 25 – March 5	Intense tropical cyclone	175 km/h (109 mph)	935 hPa (27.6105 inHg)	Mozambique, Zambia, Zimbabwe	Unknown	25	
Kalunde	March 3–14	Intense tropical cyclone	215 km/h (134 mph)	910 hPa (26.8723 inHg)	Rodrigues Island	$3.15 million	None	
Luma	April 8–11	Subtropical depression	130 km/h (81 mph)	980 hPa (28.9394 inHg)	None	None	None	
Manou	May 2–10	Tropical cyclone	155 km/h (96 mph)	950 hPa (28.0535 inHg)	Madagascar	Unknown	89	
Season aggregates
15 systems	September 4 – May 10		215 km/h (134 mph)	910 hPa (26.8723 inHg)		>$6.7 million	>169	

== See also ==
- List of Southern Hemisphere tropical cyclone seasons
- Atlantic hurricane seasons: 2002, 2003
- Pacific hurricane seasons: 2002, 2003
- Pacific typhoon seasons: 2002, 2003
- North Indian Ocean cyclone seasons: 2002, 2003
