= Mare aux Vacoas =

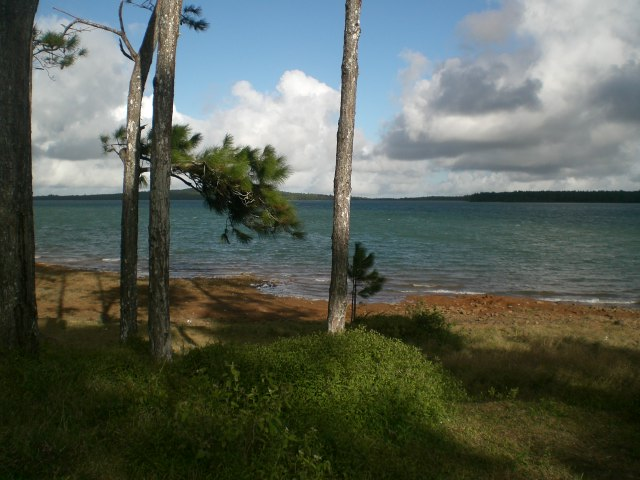
- Mare aux Vacoas

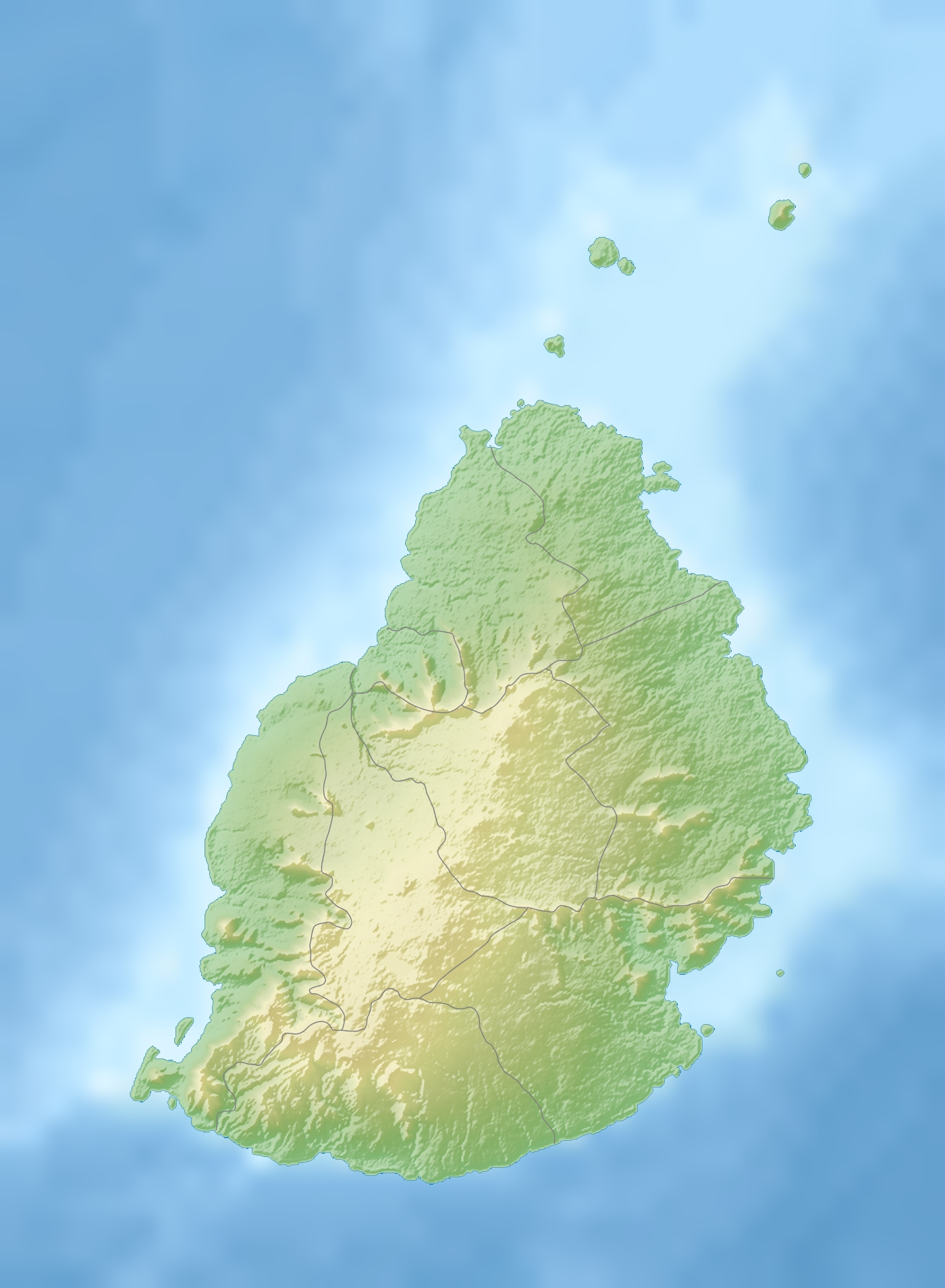
- Location within Mauritius
- Location: Mauritius
- Coordinates: 20°22′S 57°30′E
- Type: reservoir

Mare aux Vacoas is the largest reservoir in Mauritius. It is located in Plaines Wilhems, in the southwest of the island, to the south of the town of Curepipe. It has a capacity of 25,890,000 cubic metres (914,000,000 cu ft) and provides water to the upper Plaines Wilhems and to Moka. It was constructed in 1885.
