= Weather of 2002 =

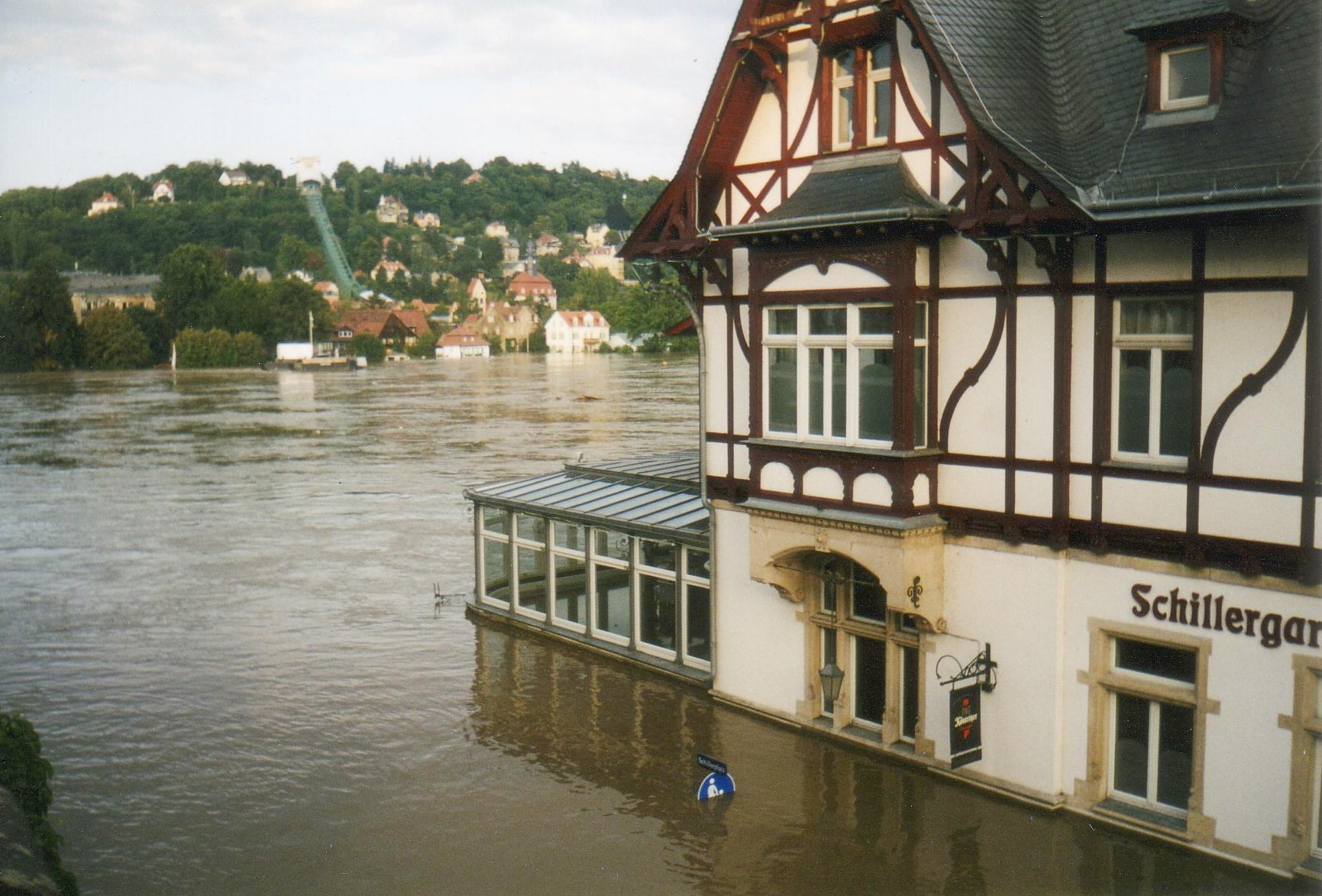
Floods in Europe in August killed 232 people.

The following is a list of weather events that occurred on Earth in 2002. There were several natural disasters around the world from various types of weather, including blizzards, cold waves, droughts, heat waves, tornadoes, and tropical cyclones. The deadliest disaster was a heat wave in India in May, which killed more than 1,030 people. The costliest event of the year was a flood in Europe in August, which killed 232 people and caused €27.7 billion (US$27.115 billion) in damage. In September, Typhoon Rusa struck South Korea, killing at least 213 people and causing at least ₩5.148 trillion (US$4.2 billion) in damage.

== Winter storms and cold waves ==
In October, Cyclone Jeanett killed 33 people when it moved across Europe.

In December, an ice storm affected North Carolina, killing 24 people.

== Droughts, heat waves, and wildfires ==
In May, a heat wave in India killed more than 1,030 people.

A drought affected much of North America.

== Floods ==
In February, flash floods affected the Bolivian capital city La Paz, killing 69 people.

On March 31, flash floods in the Canary Islands killed eight people and left €20 million in damage.

In June, floods in northern Chile killed 17 people.

In August, widespread floods occurred throughout Europe, killing 232 people. The floods and €27.7 billion (US$27.115 billion) in damage.

== Tornadoes ==
There were 934 tornadoes in the United States alone, collectively resulting in 55 deaths. A tornado outbreak in November killed 36 people.

== Tropical cyclones ==
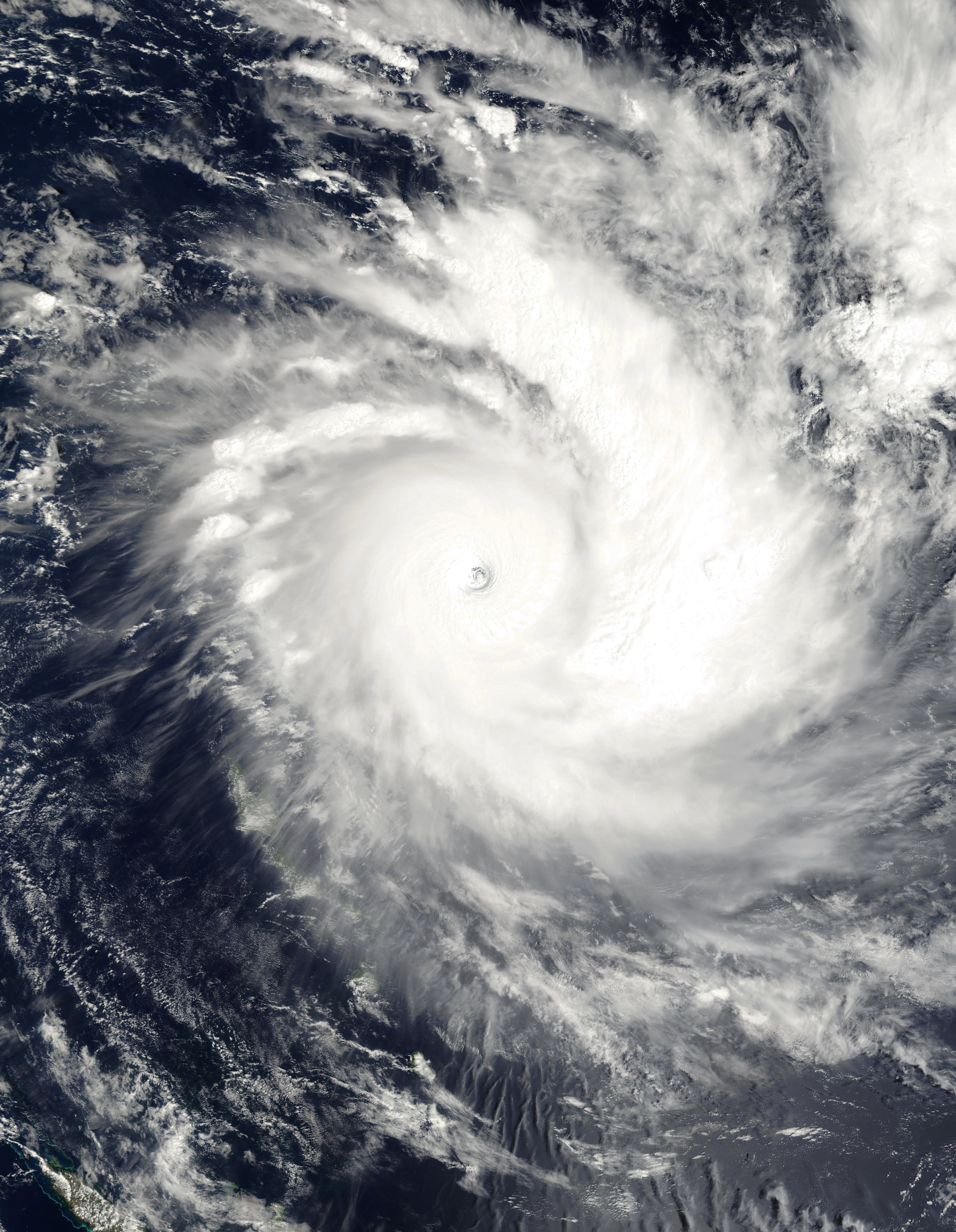
Satellite image of Cyclone Zoe, the second-strongest ever tropical cyclone in the Southern Hemisphere

The year began with Tropical Storm Cyprien developing near Madagascar, Cyclone Bernie developing off Northern Australia, Cyclone Waka moving away from Tonga, and a weak tropical depression near the Solomon Islands. There were a further 15 tropical cyclones in the south-west Indian Ocean in the year, including Cyclone Dina, which caused 15 deaths in the Mascarene Islands, and Cyclone Kesiny, which killed 33 people in Madagascar. The year ended with Tropical Storm Delfina moving ashore Mozambique. In the Australian region, nine tropical cyclones developed in the year after Bernie, including powerful Cyclone Chris which struck Western Australia. In the South Pacific, there were 16 tropical cyclones that developed after Waka. The year ended with Cyclone Zoe moving away from Fiji, three days after it became the second-most intense tropical cyclone on record within the Southern Hemisphere.

The first storm to develop in the northern hemisphere was Tropical Storm Tapah on January 9 east of the Philippines. There were a total of 36 tropical cyclones that year. Among the storms were Typhoon Rusa, which was the most powerful typhoon to strike South Korea in 43 years, and which caused at least 213 fatalities and ₩5.148 trillion (US$4.2 billion). Tropical Storm Kammuri killed 153 people in China. Mudslides caused by Typhoon Chataan killed 47 people in the Federated States of Micronesia, becoming the deadliest natural disaster in the history of Chuuk State. In the North Indian Ocean, there were seven tropical cyclones, beginning with a cyclonic storm that struck Oman in May. In November, a cyclonic storm struck West Bengal, killing 173 people. There were 19 tropical cyclones in the eastern Pacific, including three Category 5 hurricanes – Elida, Hernan, and Kenna. The last of the three, Kenna, also struck southwestern Mexico. In the Atlantic Ocean, there were 14 tropical cyclones, nine of which formed in September, including hurricanes Isidore and Lili which moved through the Caribbean and into the southern United States.

Global weather by year
Preceded by 2001	Weather of 2002	Succeeded by 2003
