= Westerly wind burst =

Weather event

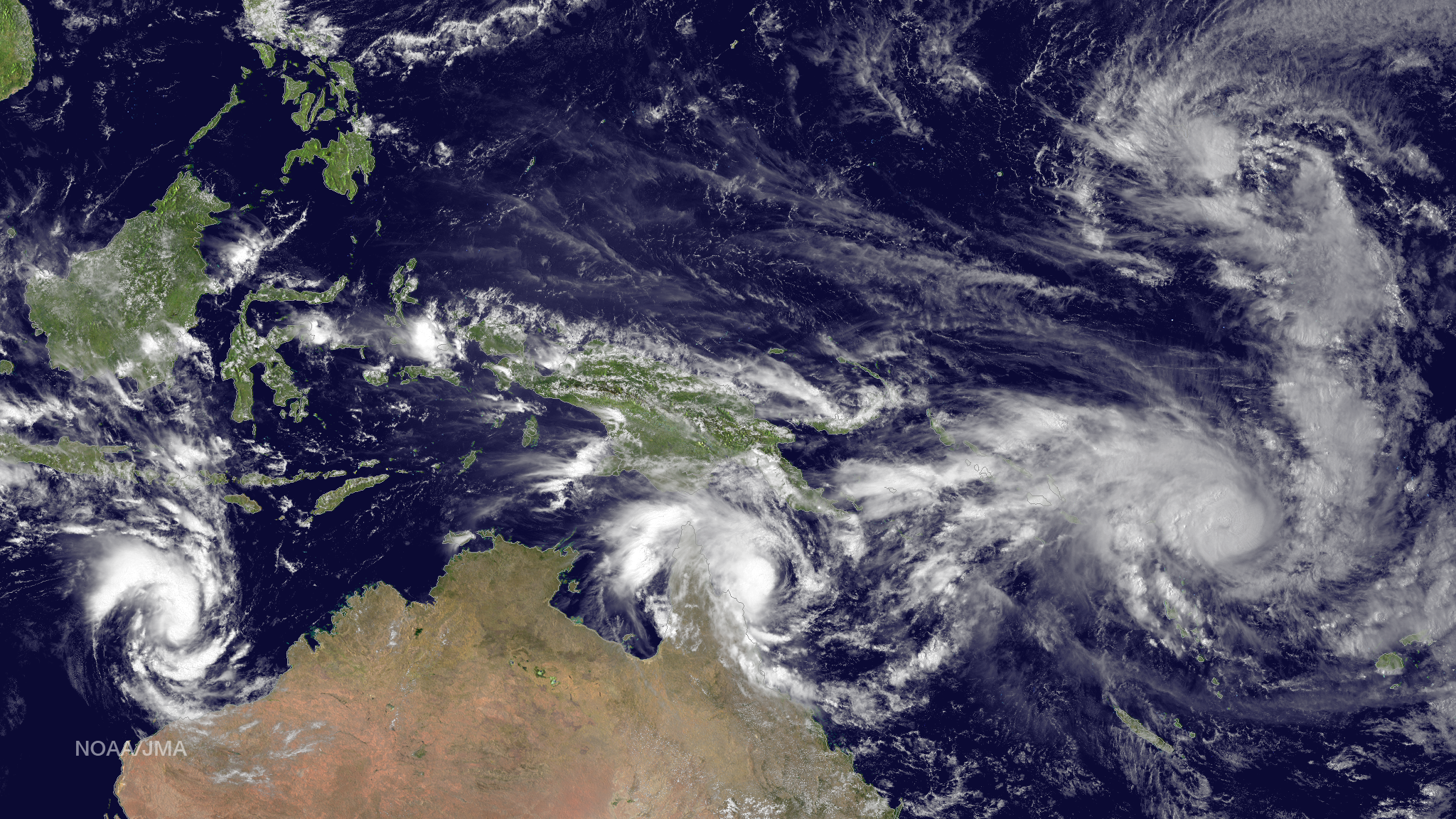
Tropical cyclones Olwyn (left), Nathan (center), Bavi (top right), and Pam (bottom right) on March 11, 2015. Bavi and Pam developed simultaneously as a result of a westerly wind burst.

A westerly wind burst (WWB) or westerly wind event (WWE) is a phenomenon commonly associated with El Niño events, whereby the typical east-to-west trade winds across the equatorial Pacific shift to west-to-east.

== Definition ==
A westerly wind burst is defined by Harrison and Vecchi (1997) as sustained winds of 25 km/h (16 mph) over a period of 5–20 days. However, no concrete definition has been determined, with Tziperman and Yu (2007) defining them as having winds of 14 km/h (8.7 mph) and lasting "at least a few days".

On average, three of these events take place each year, but are significantly more common during El Niño years. They have been linked to various mesoscale phenomena, including tropical cyclones, mid-latitude cold surges, and the Madden–Julian oscillation. Their connection with Kelvin waves also indicate a connection with the onset of El Niño events, with every major occurrence since the 1950s featuring a westerly wind burst upon their onset.

== Studies ==
Recent studies, including Yu et al. (2003), have indicated some correlation between westerly wind bursts and the El Niño–Southern Oscillation (ENSO). These events occur more frequently when the equatorial Pacific warm pool is extended by ENSO events. A significant relationship exists between the frequency of westerly wind bursts and the central equatorial Pacific sea surface temperatures, with events commonly taking place when 29 °C (84 °F) temperatures were present. The wind bursts also traveled along with the warm pool, propagating west to east.

== Cyclones ==
A westerly wind burst event can often result in the formation of twin tropical cyclones in the Pacific, with events occurring annually on average. These events spur counter-clockwise rotation in the Northern Hemisphere and clockwise rotation in the Southern Hemisphere—a key component of low pressure systems. For example, during July 2015 Typhoon Chan-hom and Cyclone Raquel developed simultaneously over the Northwestern and Southwestern Pacific, respectively, in conjunction with a westerly wind burst. This was also the only known instance of twin cyclones during July and attributed to the record strength of the 2014–16 El Niño event. Another unusually strong wind burst led to the atypical formations of Tropical Depression Nine-C and Hurricane Pali in late December 2015 and early January 2016, respectively along with the formation of Cyclone Ula in the Central and Southwestern Pacific.

Similarly, the formation of twin cyclones along the equatorial Pacific can spur the formation of a westerly wind burst and enhance El Niño events. In May 2002, a strong westerly wind burst moved from west to east across the Indian Ocean, producing two separate sets of twin cyclones. It first led to the development of Cyclone Kesiny in the south-west Indian Ocean and a storm that struck Oman, and later spawned a deep depression that struck Myanmar and Tropical Storm Errol to the southwest of Indonesia. A very powerful westerly wind burst event in early-April 2026 spawned three tropical cyclones: Cyclone Maila in the Australian region, Cyclone Vaianu in the South Pacific, and Typhoon Sinlaku in the North-Western Pacific.

== See also ==
- Trade winds
