= Cyclone Kesiny =

South-West Indian cyclone in 2002

Tropical Cyclone Kesiny
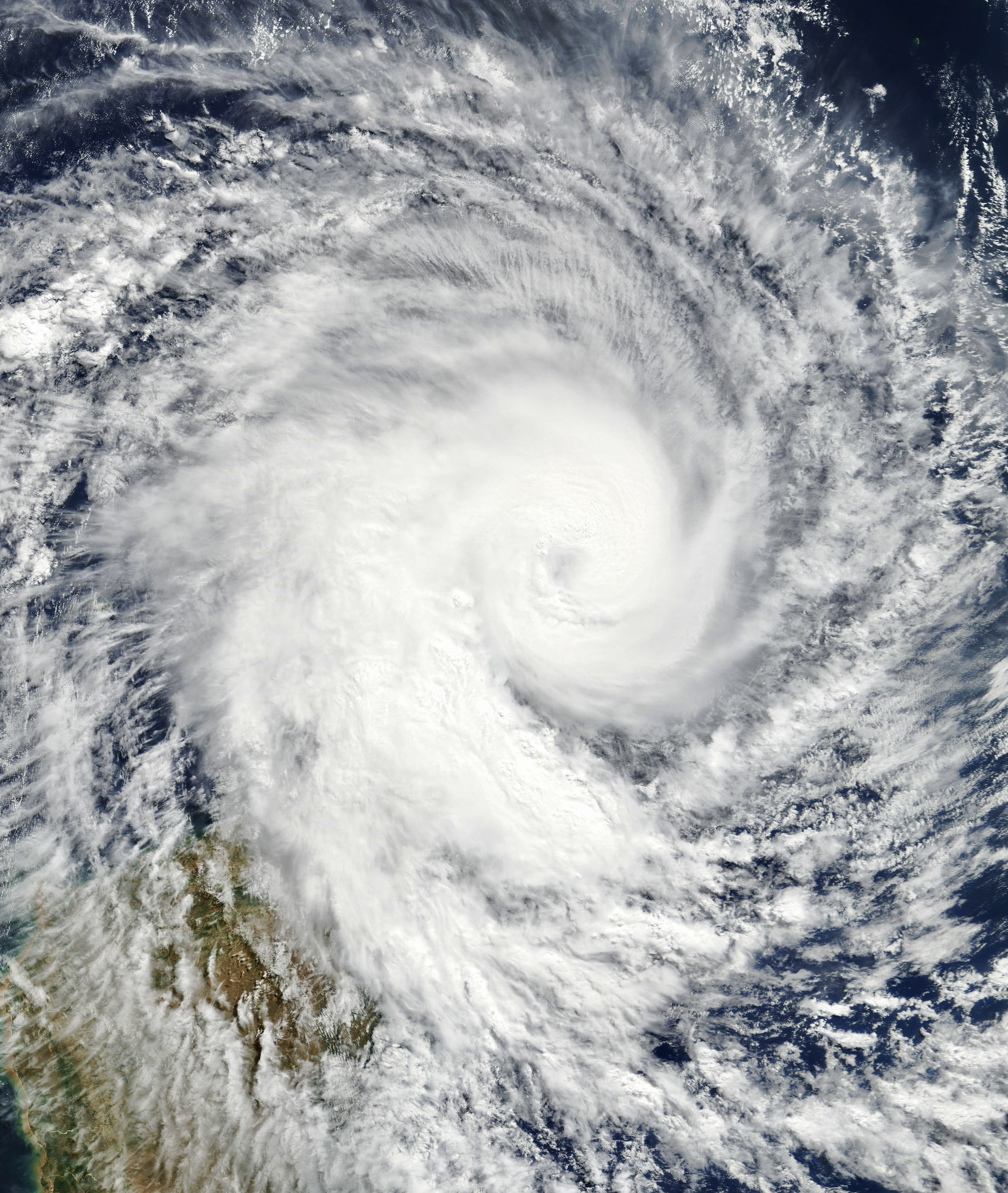
- Tropical Cyclone Kesiny near peak intensity on May 9

Meteorological history
- Formed: May 2, 2002
- Dissipated: May 11, 2002

Tropical cyclone
- 10-minute sustained (MFR)
- Highest winds: 130 km/h (80 mph)
- Lowest pressure: 965 hPa (mbar); 28.50 inHg

Category 1-equivalent tropical cyclone
- 1-minute sustained (SSHWS/JTWC)
- Highest winds: 120 km/h (75 mph)
- Lowest pressure: 976 hPa (mbar); 28.82 inHg

Overall effects
- Fatalities: 33 direct
- Areas affected: Madagascar
- IBTrACS
- Part of the 2001–02 South-West Indian Ocean cyclone season

Tropical Cyclone Kesiny was the first recorded tropical cyclone – the equivalent of a minimal hurricane – to make landfall in the month of May in the south-west Indian Ocean. The final named storm of the busy 2001–02 South-West Indian Ocean cyclone season, Kesiny formed on May 2 from a trough near the equator. Its formation was the result of an increase in the Madden–Julian oscillation, which also contributed to a twin storm in the north Indian Ocean that hit Oman, and another set of storms in northeast and southeast Indian Ocean. Kesiny initially moved to the southeast, but later turned to the southwest due to a strengthening ridge. On May 6, it intensified into a tropical cyclone, but later weakened and was not expected to re-strengthen. However, Kesiny developed an eye and re-intensified into a tropical cyclone on May 9, reaching peak winds of 130 km/h (81 mph) before striking Madagascar about 60 km (37 mi) southeast of Antsiranana. It weakened while crossing the country, and after turning to the south it struck the country again before dissipating on May 11.

Across Madagascar, Cyclone Kesiny dropped heavy rainfall, reaching 891 mm (35.1 in) in three days at Toamasina, the second largest city in the country. The rains caused mudslides and flooding in the eastern portion of the country, wrecking the rice and maize crops and leaving 5,000 people homeless. At least 33 bridges were destroyed, and many roads were damaged. A total of 33 people were killed, and 1,200 people were injured. The cyclone struck in the midst of a political crisis, in which the top two candidates of the Malagasy presidential election in 2001 declared themselves the winner; the incumbent, who lost, declared Toamasina as the capital city, and the political instability disrupted relief efforts.

== Meteorological history ==
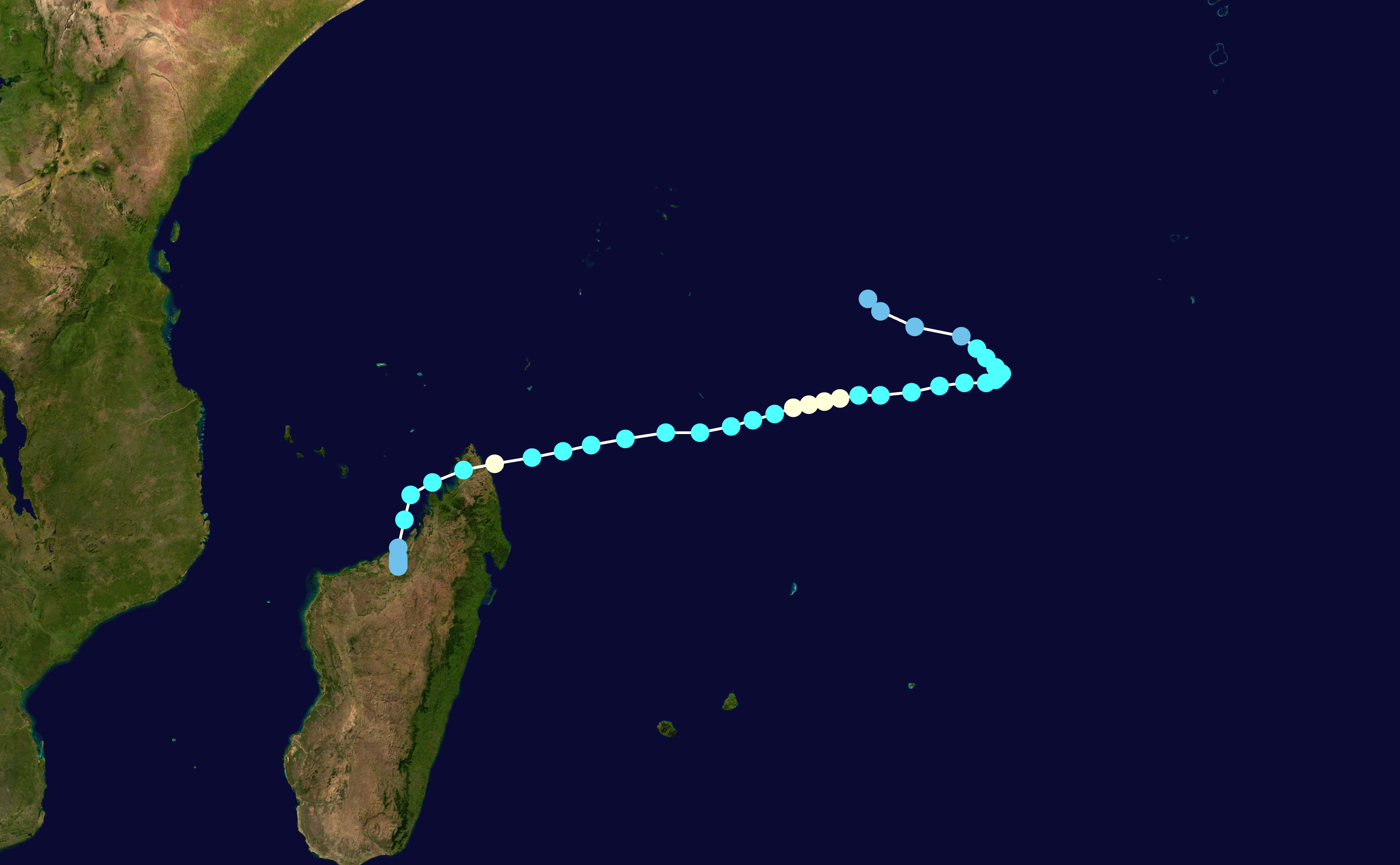
Map plotting the storm's track and intensity, according to the Saffir–Simpson scale Map key Saffir–Simpson scale Tropical depression (≤38 mph, ≤62 km/h) Tropical storm (39–73 mph, 63–118 km/h) Category 1 (74–95 mph, 119–153 km/h) Category 2 (96–110 mph, 154–177 km/h) Category 3 (111–129 mph, 178–208 km/h) Category 4 (130–156 mph, 209–251 km/h) Category 5 (≥157 mph, ≥252 km/h) Unknown Storm type Tropical cyclone Subtropical cyclone Extratropical cyclone, remnant low, tropical disturbance, or monsoon depression

In late April 2002, an area of convection, or thunderstorms, persisted to the west-southwest of Diego Garcia in the south-central Indian Ocean, associated with a trough near the equator. The system had a broad circulation, and initially moved slowly to the east-southeast. It developed due to an increase in the Madden–Julian oscillation (MJO), which moved eastward across the Indian Ocean. The same system spawned a disturbance in the northern Indian Ocean that later struck Oman as a tropical cyclone. Such simultaneous systems in opposite hemispheres occasionally occur in the spring or autumn; in May 2002, the powerful MJO pulse produced two such sets of storms, later producing a set in the eastern Indian Ocean that became a deep depression that struck Myanmar and Tropical Storm Errol to the southwest of Indonesia. On April 30, Météo-France (MFR) classified the system as a zone of disturbed weather. It slowly organized, prompting the Joint Typhoon Warning Center (JTWC) to issue a tropical cyclone formation alert late on May 2, around the time that MFR classified it as Tropical Disturbance 14. The thunderstorms became more concentrated around an increasingly well-defined center, and with minimal wind shear, the system strengthened into Tropical Depression 14 on May 3. That day, the JTWC initiated advisories on Tropical Cyclone 23S.

Developing rainbands and a central dense overcast, the depression intensified into Tropical Storm Kesiny early on May 4. Gradual intensification continued, although initially the convection remained dislocated to the west of the center. The circulation later moved beneath the thunderstorms, and a strengthening ridge turned Kesiny toward the west-southwest. Late on May 5, a ragged eye began forming within the convection, which was indicative of a strengthening storm. That day, MFR upgraded Kesiny to a severe tropical storm. Early on May 6, the JTWC upgraded the storm to the equivalent of a minimal hurricane, with maximum 1 minute sustained winds of 120 km/h (75 mph). Around that time the outflow became pronounced to the north and south, although a decrease in outflow caused Kesiny to weaken. By May 7, the circulation was exposed from the convection, and little re-intensification was expected. By that time, the storm was located about 650 km (400 mi) east of the northern tip of Madagascar.

Despite predictions for no further intensification, Kesiny redeveloped convection late on May 8 that organized into a central dense overcast. By early on May 9, another eye had developed, and the storm quickly intensified into a tropical cyclone, according to MFR. This occurred despite little change in atmospheric conditions, although outflow had improved. Later on May 9, Kesiny struck northeastern Madagascar about 60 km (37 mi) southeast of Antsiranana, with peak winds of 130 km/h (81 mph). This made it the first known tropical cyclone on record to make landfall in the month in the basin. While crossing northern Madagascar, the eye quickly dissipated, and the winds decreased. Although re-intensification was expected over the Mozambique Channel, Kesiny remained weak while turning toward the south. On May 10, the storm weakened to a tropical depression, and subsequently it made a second landfall about 75 km (47 mi) northeast of Mahajanga. Kesiny dissipated on May 11 while inland.

== Impact and aftermath ==
Cyclone Kesiny near landfall

While moving through Madagascar, the cyclone produced strong winds, with gusts up to 181 km/h (112 mph) reported. Kesiny dropped heavy rainfall, particularly to the southeast of the center in the outer rainbands. In Toamasina, the second largest city in the country, 484 mm (19.1 in) of precipitation fell in 24 hours, and 891 mm (35.1 in) fell in three days. In northern Madagascar, rainfall totals were around 200 mm (7.9 in), although they occurred outside the typical rainy season. The three-day total of 136 mm (5.4 in) in Antsiranana was eight times the average May precipitation, and occurred at the start of harvesting for rice and maize. As a result, over 50% of each of the crops were destroyed by Kesiny, amounting to thousands of hectares of destroyed crop fields. The rains caused 63 landslides in the area around Toamasina, destroying 16 bridges. The rains caused widespread flooding and mudslides, including in Toamasina. Flooding contaminated water wells, and many areas lost power for at least five days. In Nosy Be, an island offshore northwestern Madagascar, Kesiny capsized a few boats, and killed two people after a house collapsed. About 165,000 residents in Toamasina lost both power and water. In Fenoarivo Atsinanana, seven people died, and the cyclone damaged or destroyed 17 bridges. Throughout the country, Kesiny killed at least 33 people, many of whom due to drownings, and 5,000 people were left homeless. Overall, about 500,000 people were directly affected, and 1,200 people were injured.

Cyclone Kesiny struck Madagascar during a period of political strife after the Malagasy presidential election in 2001. In the election, incumbent president Didier Ratsiraka lost to Marc Ravalomanana, but rejected the results; after the election, Ratsiraka declared the city of Toamasina as the new capital of the country. The political crisis caused difficulties after the storm in distributing food, and Ratsiraka's operational center in the city was damaged. During the storm, Toamasina experienced severe flooding, forcing hundreds of residents to evacuate their homes. Emergency volunteers provided water and food to the affected residents. Workers from the World Health Organization and Médecins Sans Frontières (Doctors Without Borders) provided medical assistance to residents in Toamasina during the storm. Damaged roads contributed to economic contraction, after trucks were unable to use roads and bridges in the eastern portion of the country. By October, the political crisis had ended, and the government repaired most of the damaged infrastructure. The cost of repairing the roads and bridges was about $2.5 million (2002 USD), which was paid by a $50 million credit from the World Bank Group. Due to poor harvest related to the storm in some areas, the World Food Programme provided 18,000 tonnes of food to 394,250 residents, beginning in November 2002 at the request of the Malagasy government. After the storm, the government of Norway donated kr1.2 million (2002 Norwegian krone, US$172,000) for storm relief, and the government of Switzerland provided about $33,000 (USD).

== See also ==
- Tropical cyclones in 2002
- Weather of 2002
- Cyclone Gafilo – intense cyclone that struck northeastern Madagascar in 2004
