= 2002 La Paz floods =

Natural disaster in Bolivia

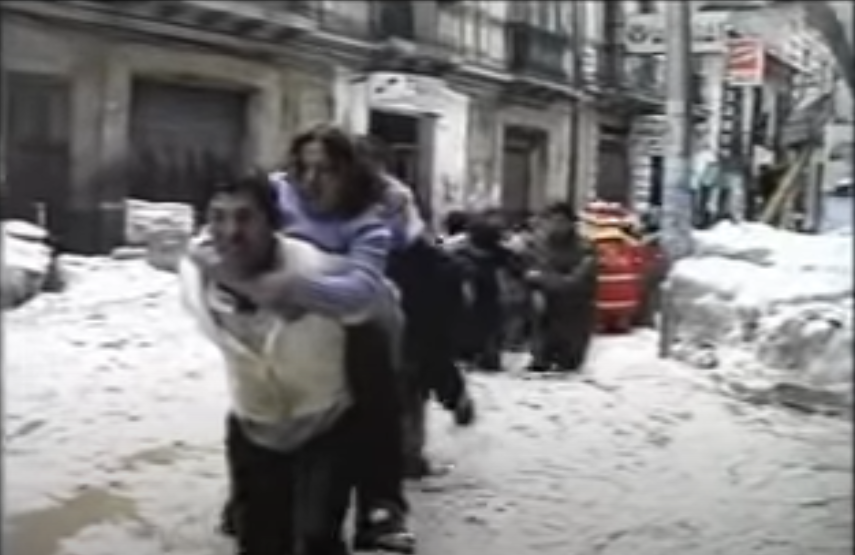
- People carrying wounded on Honda St, La Paz Bolivia 2002 Floods
- Date: February 2002
- Location: La Paz, Bolivia
- Cause: Torrential rain, landslides

The Bolivian flood of 2002 was a disastrous flood in La Paz city that affected many places on February 19, 2002. Torrents of water raged through the streets destroying road surfaces brick walls, torrents of water dragged people through the streets of the city. The flash flooding caused at least 69 deaths and 150 people received treatment in city hospitals. It was one of the worst of the decade terrible flood that affected La Paz city and the government financed the economic and natural losses.

== Chronology of events ==
1. At 2:20 pm on February 19, 2002, a height of 10 km of cloud mass caused a great hail
2. The hailstorm lasted an hour and a half
3. At 3:30 pm there were multiple floods risking the lives of many people
4. The hailstorm ended at 3:45 pm
5. Emergency and fire brigade are called immediately to attend to the affected areas.
6. There were also many volunteers who helped to collaborate in the emergency situation.
7. There were power cuts that aggravated the situation of the emergency phase.
8. Until 8 pm there were 130 injured and 50 missing.
9. The final report was 69 deaths from hailstorm.
10. The government proceeded to make heavy expenses to redress the damages.

== Background ==
The city of La Paz presents a very complex topography. One of the factors that caused the floods was the collapse of the Choqueyapu River, since due to its poor structure in one of its points, and because it is a channel through which wastewater passes, it collapsed during heavy rains.

The structure that the city has is characterized by steep slopes and a geological substrate that alternates permeable and impermeable layers, favored the amplification of the accident.

Another factor that could cause this incident was the high vulnerability of the city, with intense occupation of risk areas and that it has buildings and infrastructure poorly prepared to face situations like this.

== Consequences ==
Lots of volunteers started joining the firefighters and the police efforts to relieve the extreme hail the city has received. Honda St. was considerably affected because the sewer system at that time couldn't withstand the 40cm of hail. As a result, a new sewer system was installed. Also, the street was leveled to prevent the effects of a future flood.

Lots of shops and street vendors lost their products. Official estimates point out that nearly 60 millions dollars were lost that day. Juan del Granado, mayor of La Paz, stated that relief efforts would go on for 10 days at least with 2000 workers deployed to help the many areas that were affected by the flood.

As a result of the flood, 200 families had to abandon their houses. However harsh, the flood didn't affect the whole city. Downtown and the south side of the city were the most affected, along with some north eastern areas of the city.[5]

Street markets, such as Uyustus, and Max Paredes were severely affected by the flood.
