= 2002 Indian heat wave =

Major Heatwave in India

Meteorological history
- Duration: May 2002
- Heat wave

Overall effects
- Fatalities: 1,030
- Areas affected: India

More than 1,030 people were killed in the 2002 heatwave in South India. Most of the dead were poor and elderly and a majority of deaths occurred in the southern state of Andhra Pradesh. In the districts that were impacted most, the heat was so severe that ponds and rivers evaporated and in those same districts birds had fallen from the sky and animals were collapsing from the intense heat.

It is said by officials to be the worst heat wave in four years. The relief commissioner of Andhra Pradesh, Rosaiah, said that the maximum number of 172 deaths related to heat took place in the East Godavari district. There were also 166 deaths in Prakasam and 144 deaths in West Godavari.

Unusually high temperatures were detected across India during April of the year 2002. In addition, this heat wave over northern zones of India lasted from the middle of April to the third week in May, thus, causing these fatalities. On May 10 the highest temperature recorded in the region of Gannavaram (Vijayawada) was 49 °C (120 °F). According to the BBC News, "Heatwaves are defined as periods of abnormally high temperatures and usually occur between March and June in India. May is the country's hottest month, with an average maximum temperature of 41 °C (104 °F) in Delhi. Longer, more severe heatwaves are becoming increasingly frequent globally. Intense heat can cause cramps, exhaustion and heat stroke. Thousands of people have died across India during heatwaves in 2002 and 2003." The heatwaves also affected the northern states of Punjab, and Haryana. In Orissa, 100 people suffered from heat-related sickness.

== Background and details of the 2002 Indian heat wave ==
=== Definition of Heat Wave ===
Heatwave as a hazard causing disaster scenario is little more than the physical phenomenon of high heat conditions and is characterized as a complex of hydro-climatic risks coupled with social, occupational, and public health risks. A Heat Wave is a period of abnormally high temperatures, more than the normal maximum temperature that occurs during the summer season in the North-Western parts of India.

=== 2002 Indian Heat Wave ===
One of the worst heat waves so far swept through India in May 2002. This was caused by an extreme drought triggered by the El Niño effect. The fierce heatwave killed more than 1,000 people in the country. Elderly people account for most of the deaths, unable to bear temperatures that hit 50 °C (122 °F) in parts of the southern Andhra Pradesh state during the week of May 9–15. In some areas, temperatures were so extreme that many tin-roofed homes turned into ovens, water catchments dried up and animals collapsed from the heat. Heatwave in 2002 led not only to a very high mortality rate, but also to the high morbidity of many heat-related diseases and caused a fatal blow to the local agriculture and economy.

=== Heatwave events in India during the past 20 years ===
Heat health impacts in India are serious. Estimates suggest that there have been over 22,000 heat-related fatalities in India since 1992. Due to the El Niño effect, 2015 is considered the hottest year ever, the country witnessed the fifth deadliest heatwave in history. The other nine warmest years on record are 2009, 2010, 2003, 2002, 2014, 1998, 2006 and 2007. In addition to the vulnerable populations identified above, the poor may be differentially impacted on account of gaps in health services, housing, and basic amenities.

=== Heatwave developing trend ===
India Meteorological Department report says that heat waves (40 °C+ temperatures) are recurring more frequently and with greater intensity every year in India due to climate change and global warming. Therefore, harder works should not only be taken on alleviating the negative impact of the heatwave, but also the root cause problem of climate warming.

== Impact of heatwave as a disaster ==
=== Consequences of Indian heatwave so far ===
==== Physical impacts ====
The 2002 Indian heat waves was a record-breaking event, which can be considered as a wake-up call and a shock to the Indian order and development. 330 million people were impacted by this heatwave that took about 1030 lives in parts of the southern Andhra Pradesh state during the second week of May 2002, which elderly and poor people account for most of the deaths due to dehydration and heatstroke. People were unable to bear temperatures that hit 50 °C (122 °F) as well as the unusual high night-time temperatures.

==== Geographical impacts ====
The heatwave forced the early-season rice (Basmati) in the milk-ripe stage to ripening, reducing the thousand-grain mass as well as the yield due to transpiration. High-temperature damage caused detrimental impacts to the growth of crops as water supply and demand were out of balance, resulting in wilting and bud drop. In addition, such extreme events also greatly increased the water and electricity consumption of urban residents in India.

=== Causes of Increasing Heat Wave Incidents ===
==== Geographical ====
Heatwave occur mostly over an interior plain area when dry and warmer air is transported in a region with clear skies, and generally develop over Northwest India and spread gradually eastwards & southwards. The direct cause of the heatwave was the anticyclones or high-pressure ridges occurred in the atmosphere, which leads to a dry climate and a risen temperature without evaporating moisture.

==== Climate factors ====
According to case studies carried out by German climatologist Stefan Rahmstorf, there is a causal relationship between heatwave and global warming. Nonetheless, following the effects posed by the heatwave, the WHO, alongside other healthcare organizations, are coming up with strategies to bring back the world into operations.

== Response & Adjustments ==
=== Local response ===
P Tulsi Rani, special commissioner for disaster management in the state said: "The state government has taken up education programs through television and other media to tell people not to venture into the outside without a cap." In addition, the Andhra Pradesh government has advised people to stay indoors and drink plenty of water until cooler weather arrives. The local authorities arranged for drinking water supply points, oral rehydration salts and intravenous fluids in public places such as railway and bus stations, and many emergency medical camps have been set up.

=== International response ===
Neighboring Pakistan and Afghanistan are hot as well, but India to be suffering far worse. Therefore, following the example of India's measures in this regard, they were able to face the threat of a heatwave.
