= 2002 West Bengal cyclone =

North Indian cyclone in 2002

Severe Cyclonic Storm BOB 03
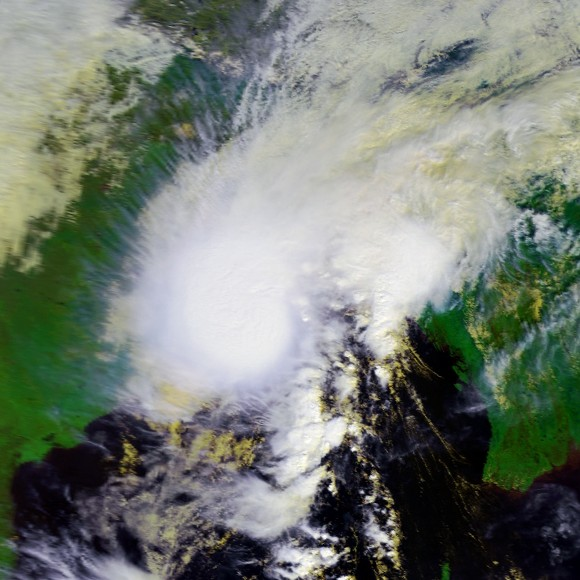
- Severe Cyclone Storm BOB 03 on 12 November 2002

Meteorological history
- Formed: 10 November 2002
- Dissipated: 12 November 2002

Severe cyclonic storm
- 3-minute sustained (IMD)
- Highest winds: 100 km/h (65 mph)
- Lowest pressure: 984 hPa (mbar); 29.06 inHg

Tropical storm
- 1-minute sustained (SSHWS/JTWC)
- Highest winds: 100 km/h (65 mph)

Overall effects
- Fatalities: 173 total
- Areas affected: India, Bangladesh
- IBTrACS
- Part of the 2002 North Indian Ocean cyclone season

The 2002 West Bengal cyclone (JTWC designation: 03B, officially known as Severe Cyclonic Storm BOB 03) was a deadly tropical cyclone that affected India and Bangladesh in November 2002. The sixth tropical cyclone and fourth cyclonic storm of the 2002 North Indian Ocean cyclone season, it developed in the Bay of Bengal northeast of Sri Lanka on 10 November, as a tropical depression. After tracking northeast, the system strengthened into a cyclonic storm on 11 November, as maximum sustained winds exceeded 65 km/h (40 mph). On 12 November, it further intensified into a severe cyclonic storm. Later that day, the storm made landfall on Sagar Island in West Bengal with winds of 100 km/h (60 mph). After moving inland, it rapidly weakened and dissipated over Bangladesh on 12 November.

Rough seas offshore Odisha caused two fishing trawlers to collide, resulting in 18 fatalities, while two additional trawlers were reported missing. In West Bengal, the storm uprooted trees and dropped heavy rainfall. Throughout India, 124 deaths were confirmed. Strong winds and heavy rainfall in Bangladesh impacted many cities and villages, including the capital city of Dhaka, forcing thousands to evacuate. Ten wooden trawlers carrying 150 men sank offshore Bangladesh, with only 11 reaching safety. Eight additional boats with 60 occupants were reported missing. One death was reported in Bangladesh after a man attempted to cross a swollen river. Overall, there were 49 fatalities in Bangladesh. The storm was attributed to at least 173 fatalities in India, Bangladesh, and offshore areas.

== Meteorological history ==
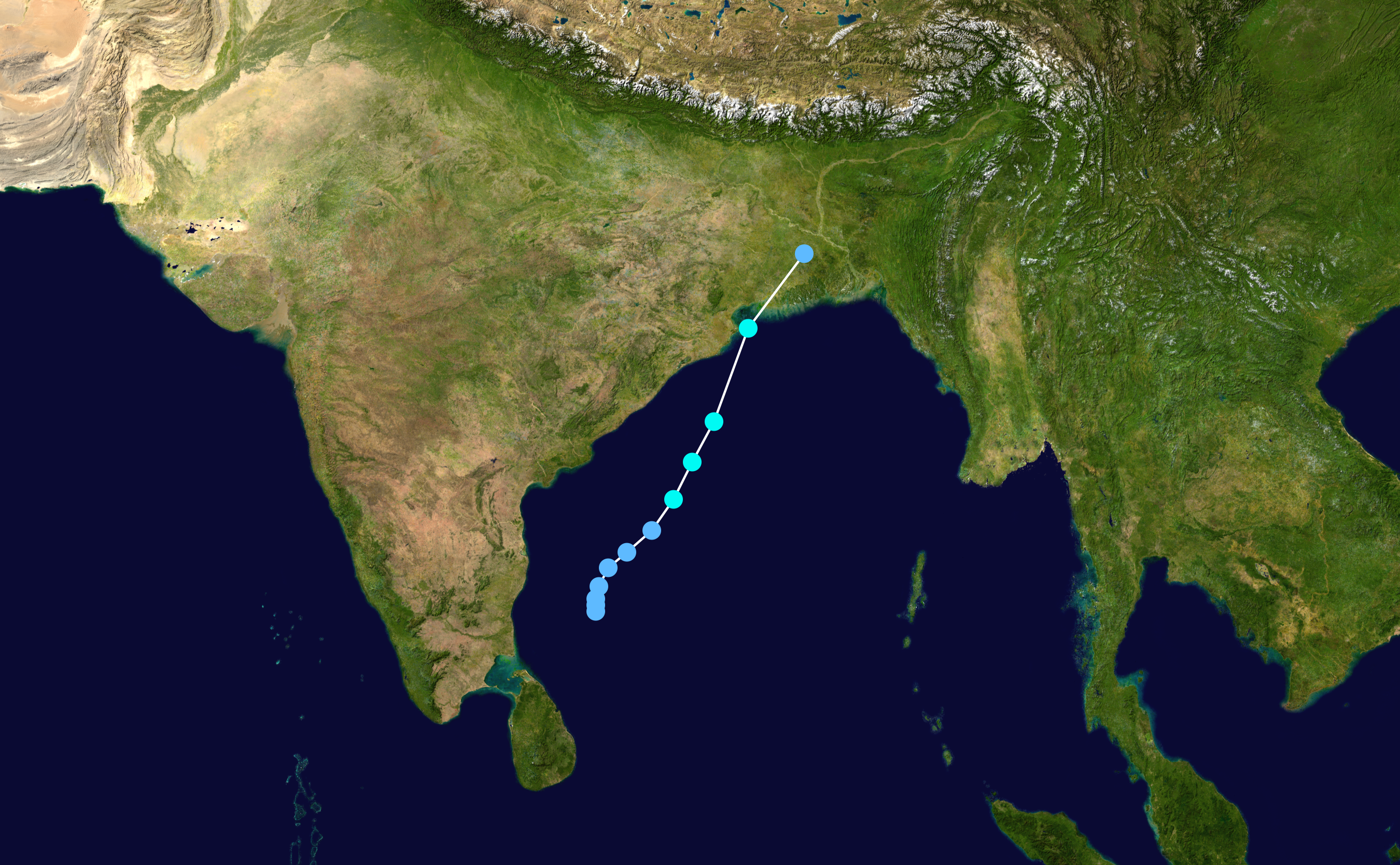
Map plotting the storm's track and intensity, according to the Saffir–Simpson scale Map key Saffir–Simpson scale Tropical depression (≤38 mph, ≤62 km/h) Tropical storm (39–73 mph, 63–118 km/h) Category 1 (74–95 mph, 119–153 km/h) Category 2 (96–110 mph, 154–177 km/h) Category 3 (111–129 mph, 178–208 km/h) Category 4 (130–156 mph, 209–251 km/h) Category 5 (≥157 mph, ≥252 km/h) Unknown Storm type Tropical cyclone Subtropical cyclone Extratropical cyclone, remnant low, tropical disturbance, or monsoon depression

Around 0300 UTC on 10 November, a depression developed in the southwestern Bay of Bengal. Three hours later, a bulletin from the India Meteorological Department (IMD) indicated that BOB 03 formed about 265 km (165 mi) east-southeast of Chennai, India. The system steadily intensified and headed northeastward. At 1200 UTC on 11 November, the depression reached gale force and was upgraded to Cyclonic Storm BOB 03. At that time, the Joint Typhoon Warning Center (JTWC) initiated warnings on Tropical Cyclone 03B. Further strengthening briefly slowed later on 11 November. However, early on the following day, the storm resumed intensification.

At 0600 UTC on 12 November, BOB 03 became a severe cyclonic storm and reached its maximum sustained wind speed of 100 km/h (60 mph), (Note: The India Meteorological Department (IMD) uses 3-minute sustained wind speeds.) in addition to an estimated minimum barometric pressure of 984 mbar (29.1 inHg). However, the Regional Meteorological Centre (RMC) in Kolkata, India bulletin at 0530 UTC on 12 November reported maximum sustained winds of only 55–75 km/h (35–45 mph). At 0900 UTC on 12 November, it made landfall near Sagar Island, West Bengal with winds of 100 km/h (60 mph). Shortly after moving inland, the storm rapidly weakened to a depression. The JTWC issued their final advisory on the storm at 1200 UTC on 12 November, while it was centered about 200 km (125 mi) northeast of Kolkata. However, the IMD tracked the cyclone until about six hours later, at which time it dissipated over eastern India.

== Impact ==
As the storm approached, residents of low-lying areas were advised to seek shelter. According to the Odisha State Disaster Management Authority, the communication system had been activated and collectors in coastal districts were given satellite telephones. Additionally, district authorities collected food, water, and other essential emergency supplies. Offshore Odisha, rough seas caused two trawlers to collide, resulting in 18 fatalities; their bodies were later found floating Dhamra Port in the Bhadrak district of Odisha. Two additional trawlers were reported missing. Nine fishing trawlers sank offshore West Bengal, with only 66 fishermen accounted for. Initially, as many as 600 were estimated to have been missing, though 250 people swam back to Digha, where most of them received treatment at either a medical clinic or a hospital. According to the Chief Minister of West Bengal, 111 people were still missing offshore West Bengal by late on November 12. Forty-nine fatalities were confirmed offshore India, while two deaths occurred inland in West Bengal. Later, the Centre for Research on the Epidemiology of Disasters raised the death toll to 124.

Prime Minister of Bangladesh Khaleda Zia urged senior officials in Dhaka and coastal districts to prepare for the storm. Officials in Chittagong asked that all 24 ships be moved out of the harbor and river channel. In coastal areas, thousands of Red Crescent volunteers reported for duty in order to assist vulnerable villages in preparation of the storm. Winds destroyed bamboo huts, uprooted trees, and disrupted road transport between towns and villages on the shore of the Bay of Bengal. Torrential rainfall in the area flooded dozens of villages, forcing thousands to evacuate. Heavy precipitation also lashed the capital city of Dhaka, inundating streets, which caused a shutdown of electricity and interrupting public transportation. One death was reported after a man drowned while attempting to cross a river in southern Bhola Island. Ten wooden trawlers carrying 150 men sank near Cox's Bazar; only 11 of them were known to have survived. An additional eight fishing boats transporting 60 people was reported missing off of Barisal Division. By November 15, 47 fishing vessels were still unaccounted for. A navy motor boat also sunk near Kutubdia, though its six crew members swam ashore. In the aftermath of the storm, the number of deaths in Bangladesh rose to 49.

Overall, the storm resulted in 173 confirmed fatalities. Officials in West Bengal accused the meteorological offices of issuing warnings too late, as most of the fishermen were already in deep sea areas. Immediately following the storm, the Indian Red Cross Society and the Participating National Societies began to assess the situation and plan. At a warehouse in Salt Lake City, Kolkata, the Indian Red Cross Society prepared to distribute 2,000 tarpaulins, 2,000 blankets, 200 kitchen sets, and 20,000 mosquito nets.

== See also ==
- 2002 North Indian Ocean cyclone season
- Cyclone Bijli
- Cyclone Viyaru
