= Tenerife flood of 2002 =

Natural disaster in Tenerife, Spain

- Native name: Riada de Tenerife de 2002
- Date: 31 March 2002
- Location: Santa Cruz de Tenerife
- Also known as: 31-M
- Type: flash flood
- Cause: cold drop
- Deaths: 8

The Tenerife flood of 2002 (Spanish: Riada de Tenerife de 2002), also known as 31-M, was a flash flood caused by a cold drop that occurred in the Santa Cruz de Tenerife area of Tenerife, Spain, on 31 March 2002. 232.6 litres per square metre of rain fell in less than six hours, causing the deaths of eight people, and damage estimated at €20 million.

== Meteorology ==
On the afternoon of 31 March 2002, Easter Sunday, a 10,000 metres (33,000 ft) high convective weather system (a cold drop) became anchored in the Santa Cruz de Tenerife region. Heavy rain started to fall at 14:40, exceeding 60mm/hour at 16:20pm, and peaking around 17:00 with 162.7 mm/hour of rain. The rate decreased after 17:30, dropping to 30mm/hour by 18:10, and stopping by 20:00. In total, 232.6 litres of rain fell per square metre.

It is still unknown how the convective system anchored itself, despite winds from the south: such a system in the area would normally move north within an hour.

It was the highest rainfall recorded in Santa Cruz for at least 70 years, although 264 litres of rain per square metre fell in 24 hours in the nearby city of San Cristóbal de La Laguna in 1977.

== Consequences ==
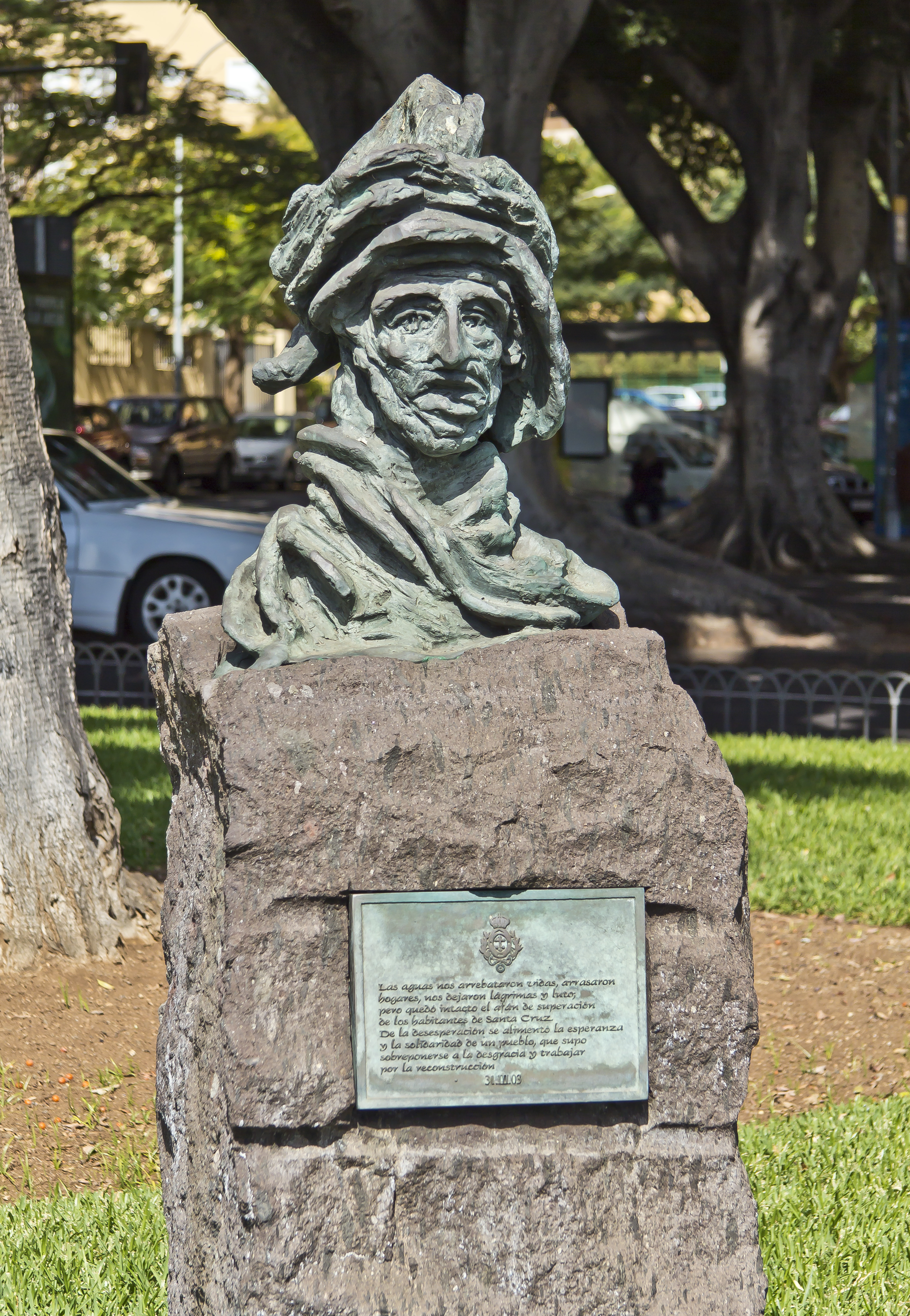
The bust in Santa Cruz that remembers the victims of the flood.

Eight people died as a result of the floods, which affected 647 houses and 423 commercial buildings. There were 40,000 power outages (restored within 72 hours), and 90,000 landline telephone outages (restored within 24 hours, mobile phone outages lasting longer), as well as and water supply and sewer system failures. The Port of Santa Cruz de Tenerife and Tenerife North Airport were both closed by the floods, as was the Cabildo de Tenerife and schools for 38,000 students.

Losses were initially estimated at €90 million, and damages were later estimated to be €20 million. Infrastructure repairs cost €21 million, while €8.7 million was spent on cleaning and improving water outlet ravines, and €1.45 million on improving the drainage around Los Valles.

The May 2002 visit of Juan Carlos I of Spain to the islands included meeting the relatives of those that died in the floods.

In 2003, artist Felipe Hodgson donated a bust entitled "Persona que mira al horizonte" ("Person looking at the horizon") to Santa Cruz.
