= 2002 North Indian Ocean cyclone season =

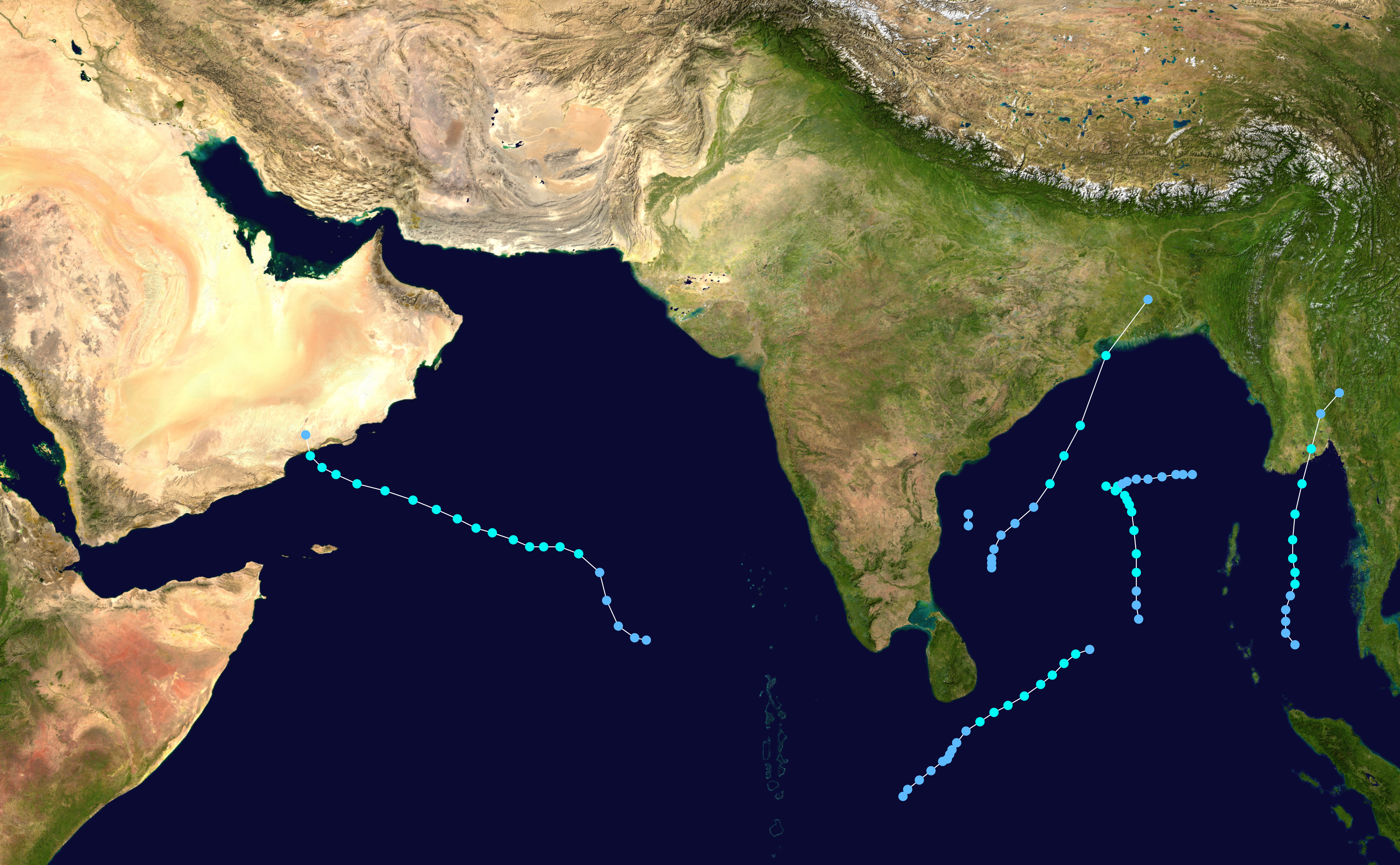
- Season summary map

Seasonal boundaries
- First system formed: May 6, 2002
- Last system dissipated: December 25, 2002

Strongest storm
- Name: BOB 03
  - Maximum winds: 100 km/h (65 mph) (3-minute sustained)
  - Lowest pressure: 984 hPa (mbar)

Seasonal statistics
- Depressions: 7
- Deep depressions: 6
- Cyclonic storms: 4
- Severe cyclonic storms: 1
- Total fatalities: At least 182 total
- Total damage: $25 million (2002 USD)

Related articles
- 2002 Atlantic hurricane season; 2002 Pacific hurricane season; 2002 Pacific typhoon season

The 2002 North Indian Ocean cyclone season was a below average season in terms of tropical cyclone formation. The season had no official bounds, but most storms formed in either May or after October. No depressions or storms formed during the monsoon season from July to September, the first such instance on record. There are two main seas in the North Indian Ocean – the Bay of Bengal to the east of the Indian subcontinent – and the Arabian Sea to the west of India. The official Regional Specialized Meteorological Centre in this basin is the India Meteorological Department (IMD), while the Joint Typhoon Warning Center (JTWC) releases unofficial advisories. An average of four to six storms form in the North Indian Ocean every season with peaks in May and November. Cyclones occurring between the meridians 45°E and 100°E are included in the season by the IMD.

Overall, there was a total of seven depressions and four cyclonic storms. The most intense and deadly tropical cyclone of the season, the West Bengal cyclone, lashed that province of India and Bangladesh in the month of November. Rough seas offshore caused at least 173 drownings offshore Bangladesh and India, while over 100 people were left missing. In West Bengal alone, 124 fatalities were reported, with over one hundred people still missing. Flooding occurred there and some areas of Bangladesh, particularly the capital city of Dhaka. Another notable storm was the Oman cyclone in May. It made a rare landfall in the Omani region of Dhofar. The storm brought historic rainfall to Oman, which in turn brought flooding to the region. Nine people drowned and damage to property, crops, and transportation reached US$25 million (2002 dollars).

== Season summary ==
Overall, the season was inactive in terms of tropical cyclone formation. The IMD tracked six tropical cyclones, which was below the average of 13 to 14 per season. No storms were active from June to September during the monsoon season, the first such instance of no depressions in the 115 year record of the IMD. Collectively, the storms of this season resulted in at least 182 deaths and $25 million (2002 USD) in damage, all of which can be attributed to ARB 01 and BOB 04.

The first storm of the season, ARB 01, developed on May 6 out of an area of low pressure over the Arabian Sea. It peaked winds of 65 km/h (40 mph) before making landfall near Salalah, Oman on May 10. The storm dissipated shortly thereafter. A deep depression, classified as BOB 02, developed in the Andaman Sea on May 10. The deep depression remained disorganized and made landfall near Yangon, Burma before dissipating on May 12. Later that month, a tropical depression, recognized only by the Thailand Meteorological Department, developed in the Bay of Bengal and also made landfall in Burma. Activity in the North Indian Ocean then went dormant for over five months, a direct result of the monsoon season in the region. Tropical cyclogenesis resumed with the development of Tropical Depression BOB 03 forming near Andhra Pradesh on October 22.

On November 11, a severe cyclonic storm – numbered BOB 04 – developed in the Bay of Bengal. It soon became the strongest tropical cyclone with maximum sustained winds of 100 km/h (60 mph) and a minimum barometric pressure of 984 mbar (29.1 inHg). BOB 04 made landfall in Bangladesh on November 12, hours before dissipating. Later in November, another cyclonic storm – assigned to BOB 05 – formed in the Bay of Bengal on November 23. It moved northward before eventually curving westward and dissipating on November 28. The final tropical cyclone developed southwest of Sri Lanka on December 21. The system headed generally east-northeastward and strengthened into cyclonic storm on December 24, before demising well east of Sri Lanka on the following day.

== Systems ==
=== Cyclonic Storm ARB 01 ===
- Cyclonic storm (IMD)
- Tropical storm (SSHWS)
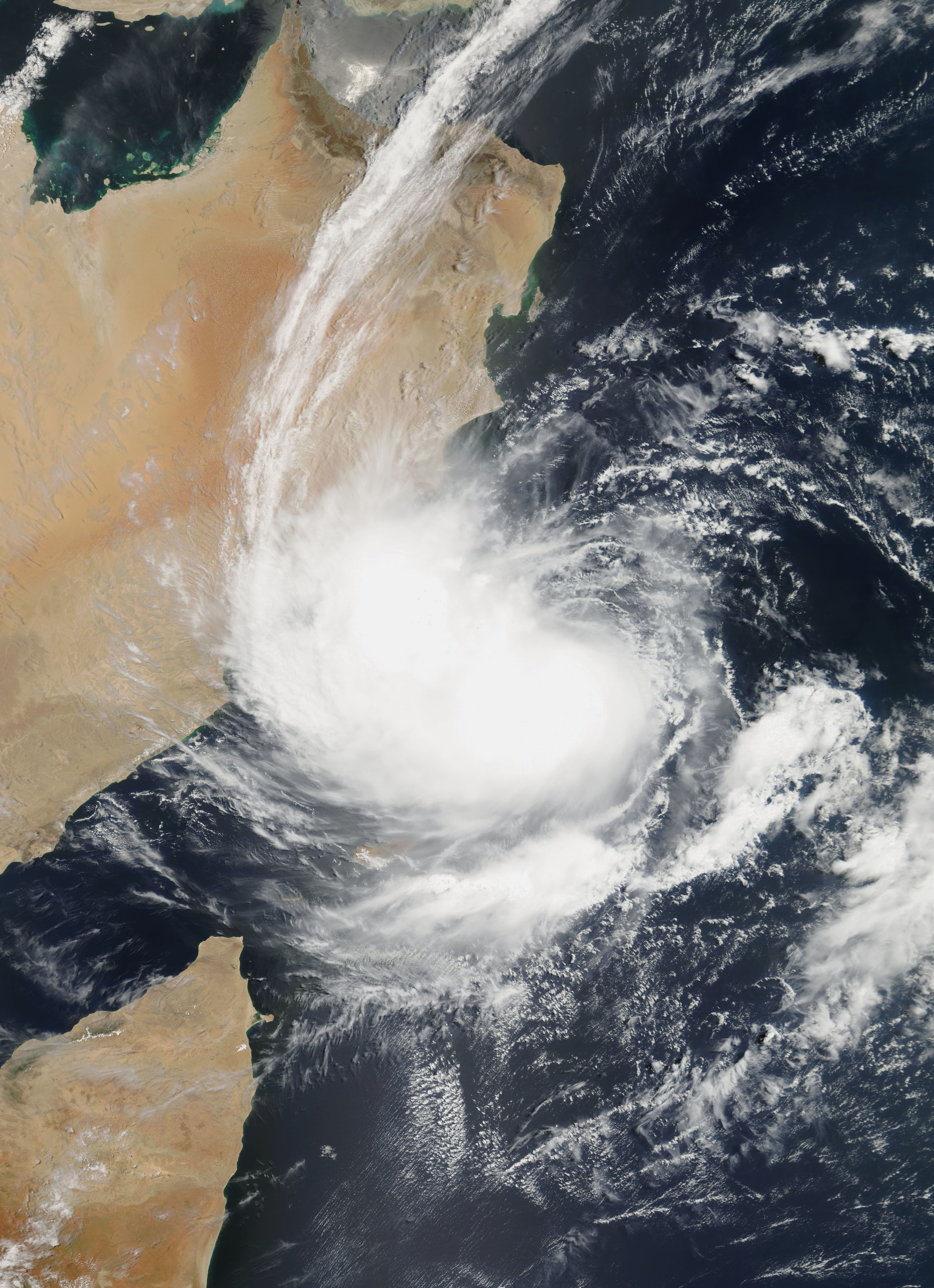
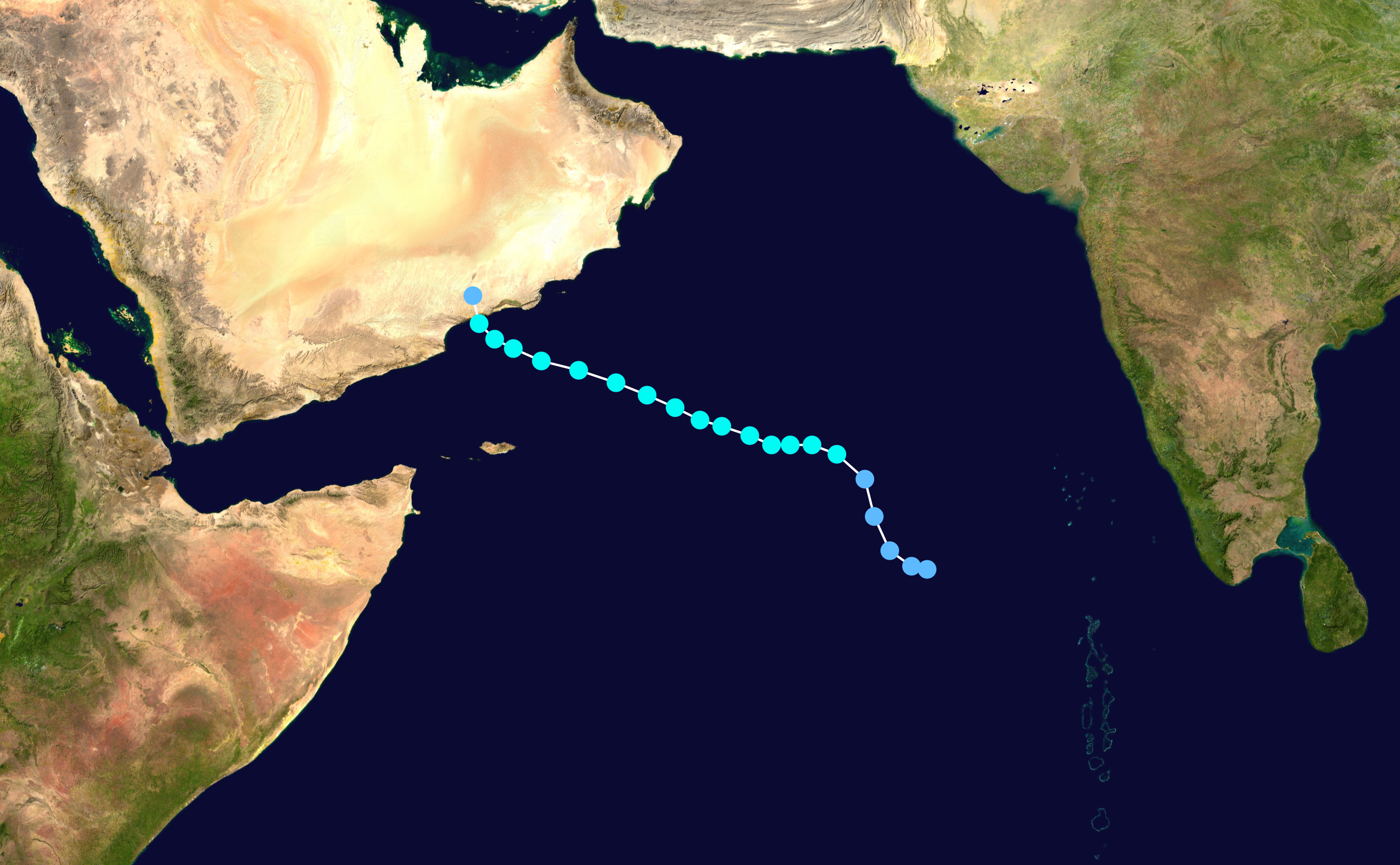
- Duration: May 6 – May 10
- Peak intensity: 65 km/h (40 mph) (3-min); 996 hPa (mbar)

A low-pressure area in the Arabian Sea developed into a depression while located a few hundred miles west-northwest of Maldives at 0300 UTC on May 6. By the following day, it had intensified into a deep depression. However, dry air diminished convection, causing the cyclone to weaken to a depression on May 8 at 0300 UTC. Nine hours later, it was upgraded back to a deep depression. On May 8, the cyclone turned west-northwestward. Further intensification occurred, with the deep depression becoming a cyclonic storm at 0600 UTC on May 9. The storm maintained its intensity until weakening slightly early on May 10, while briefly tracking northwestward. Shortly thereafter, it made landfall near Salalah, Oman. The cyclone rapidly weakened and dissipated inland later on May 10.

Waves up to 4 m (13 ft) lashed the coast of Oman, though no coastal flooding occurred. Wind gusts reaching 106 km/h (66 mph) affected some areas of Oman, while light winds were reported in Al Ghaydah, Yemen. The storm brought heavy rainfall to the Dhofar region of Oman, peaking at 251 mm (9.9 in) in the city of Qairoon. Areas in the vicinity of the landfall location of the storm experienced the highest precipitation totals in 30 years. As a result, wadis quickly became rivers, sweeping away cars and drowning nine people. Additionally, property, crops, and transportation suffered impacts from flooding. Damage from the storm totaled to $25 million, all of which was in Oman.

=== Deep Depression BOB 01 ===
- Deep depression (IMD)
- Tropical storm (SSHWS)
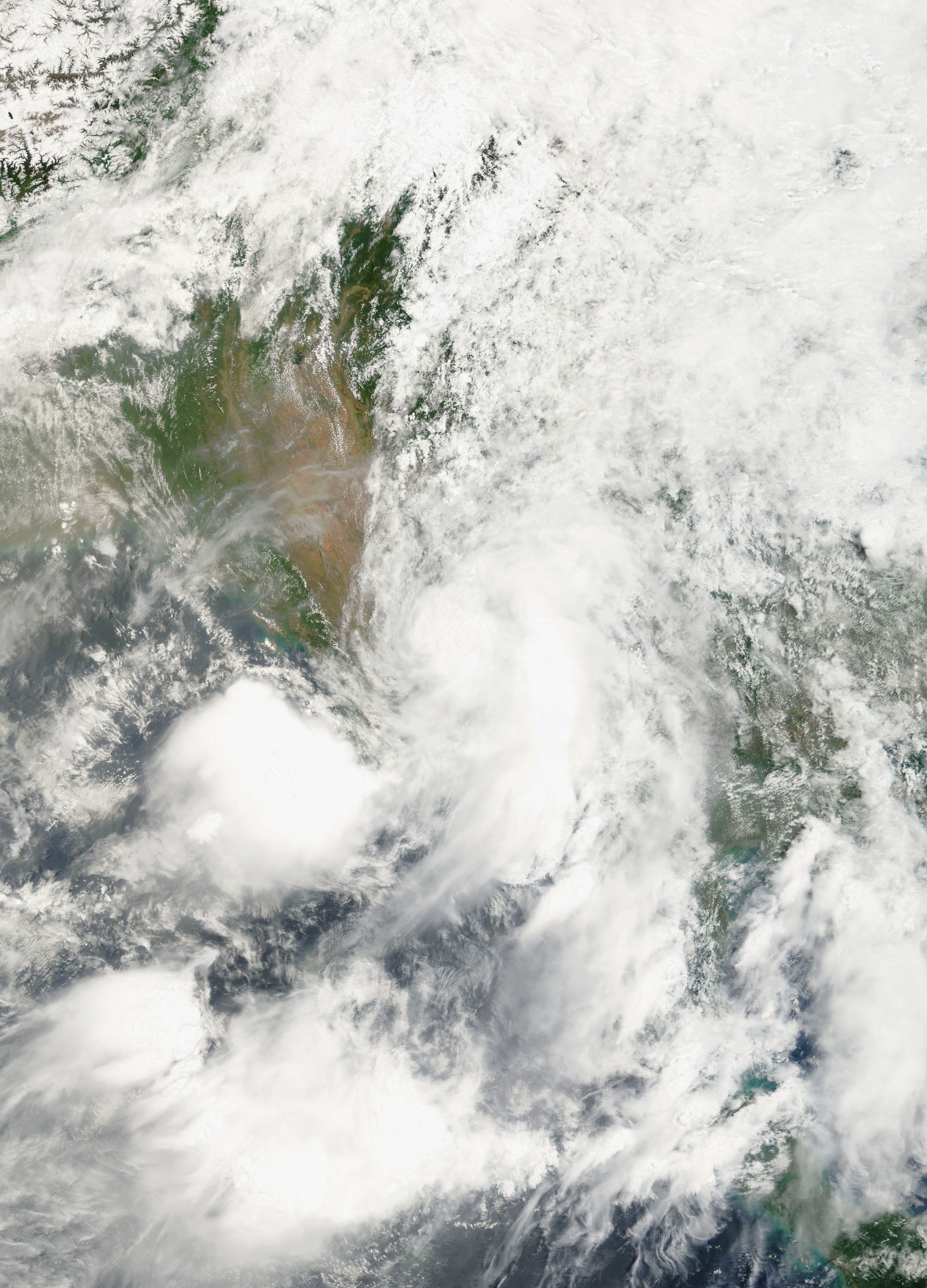
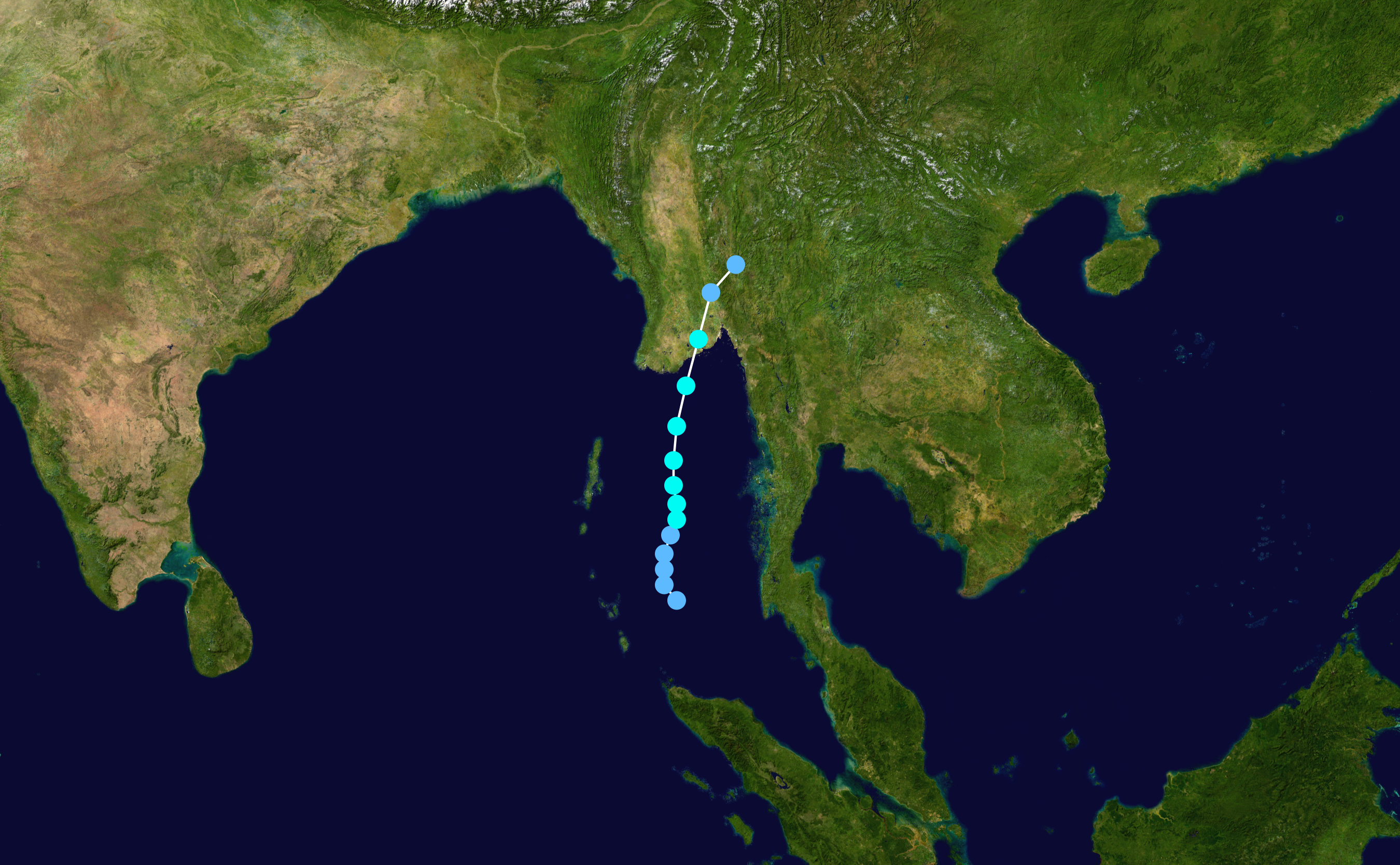
- Duration: May 10 – May 12
- Peak intensity: 55 km/h (35 mph) (3-min); 991 hPa (mbar)

A tropical disturbance near Sumatra was tracked starting on May 7. Although the system was disorganized and convection was sporadic, it managed to develop a low-level center of circulation on May 9. After significant strengthening on May 10, a Tropical Cyclone Formation Alert (TCFA) was issued later that day. Shortly thereafter, the disturbance became Tropical Cyclone 02B at 1200 UTC, while located about 230 km (140 mi) southeast of Port Blair, Andaman and Nicobar Islands. Deep convection continued to be sporadic until becoming persistent early on May 11. Around that time, the deep depression reached 3-minute sustained winds of 55 km/h (35 mph).

Later on May 11, Cyclone 01B unexpectedly accelerated to the north-northeast while crossing the northern Andaman Sea. At 2300 UTC on May 11, the cyclone made landfall just east of Yangon, Burma. By early on the following day, it weakened to a depression. The final warning on Cyclone 01B was issued at 0600 UTC on May 12 and indicated that the storm dissipated about 175 km (109 mi). The city of Yangon experienced wind gusts of about 47 km/h (29 mph), according to the JTWC. Cyclone 01B co-existed in a pair, with the southern counterpart being Tropical Cyclone Errol, which was in the South Indian Ocean within Australian Bureau of Meteorology's responsibility.

=== Tropical Depression ===
- Tropical depression (TMD)
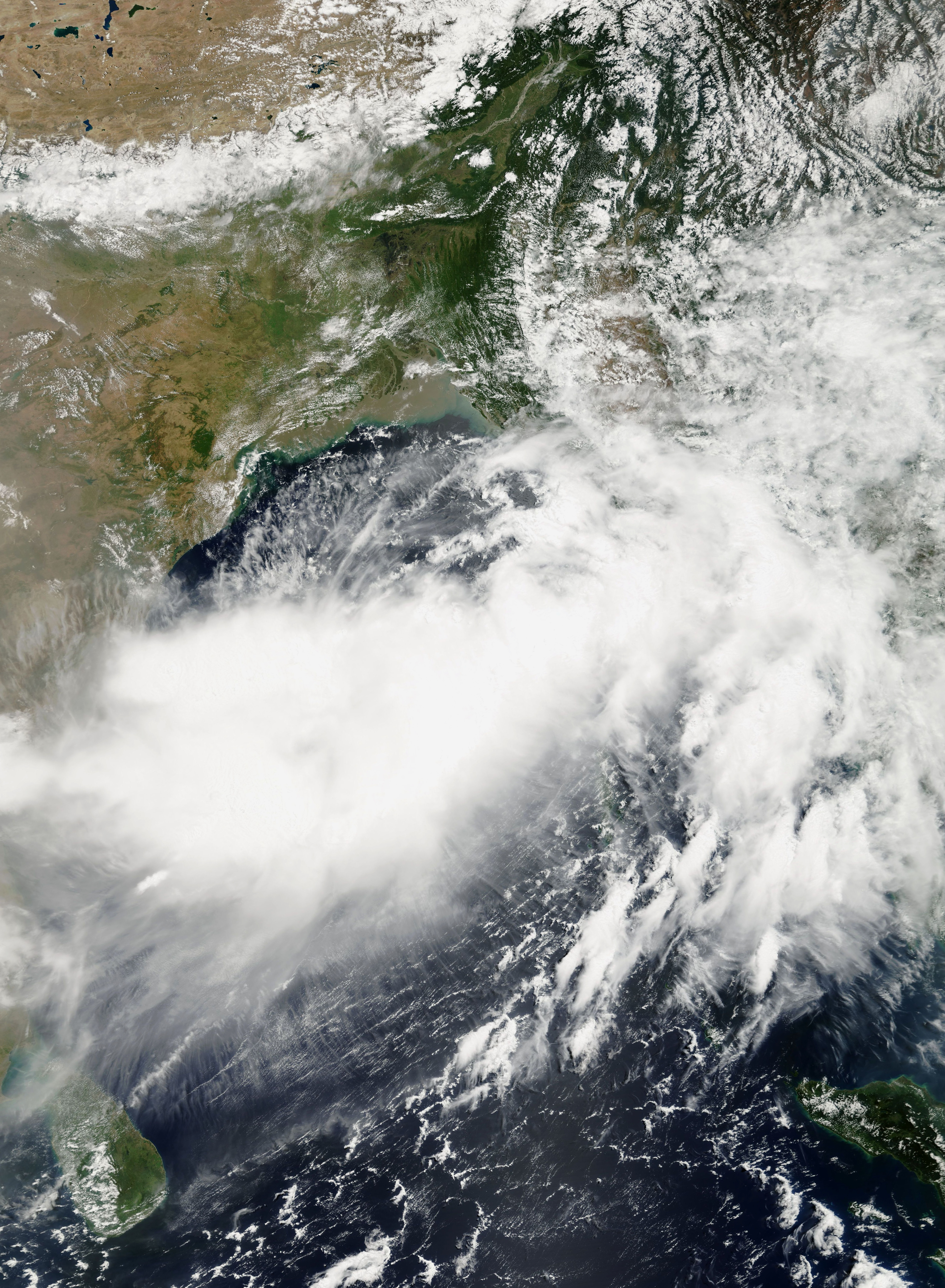
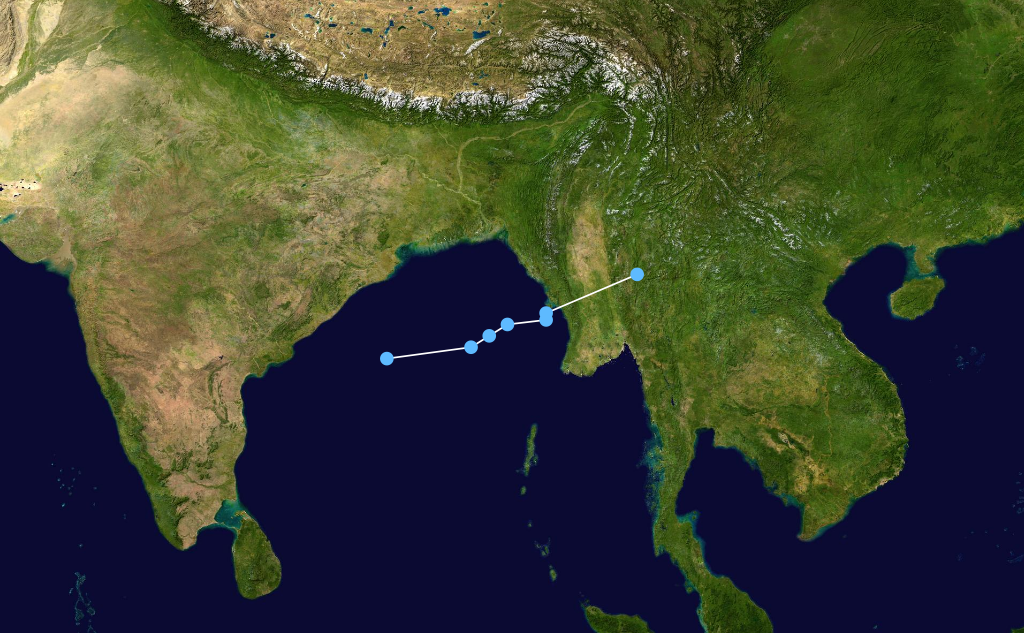
- Duration: May 17 – May 19
- Peak intensity: 55 km/h (35 mph) (10-min); 995 hPa (mbar)

The Thailand Meteorological Department began issuing advisories on a tropical depression in the Bay of Bengal on May 17. Several hours later, the JTWC issued a TCFA for the system. Minimal strengthening occurred as the depression tracked rather swiftly toward the coast of Myanmar. At 0900 UTC on May 18, the depression made landfall near Taungup, Rakhine State, with winds of 55 km/h (34 mph). The JTWC cancelled the TCFA seven hours later, having never classified the system as a tropical depression. It weakened inland and dissipated over eastern Myanmar at 0300 UTC on May 19. Impact from this system is unknown.

=== Depression BOB 02 ===
- Depression (IMD)
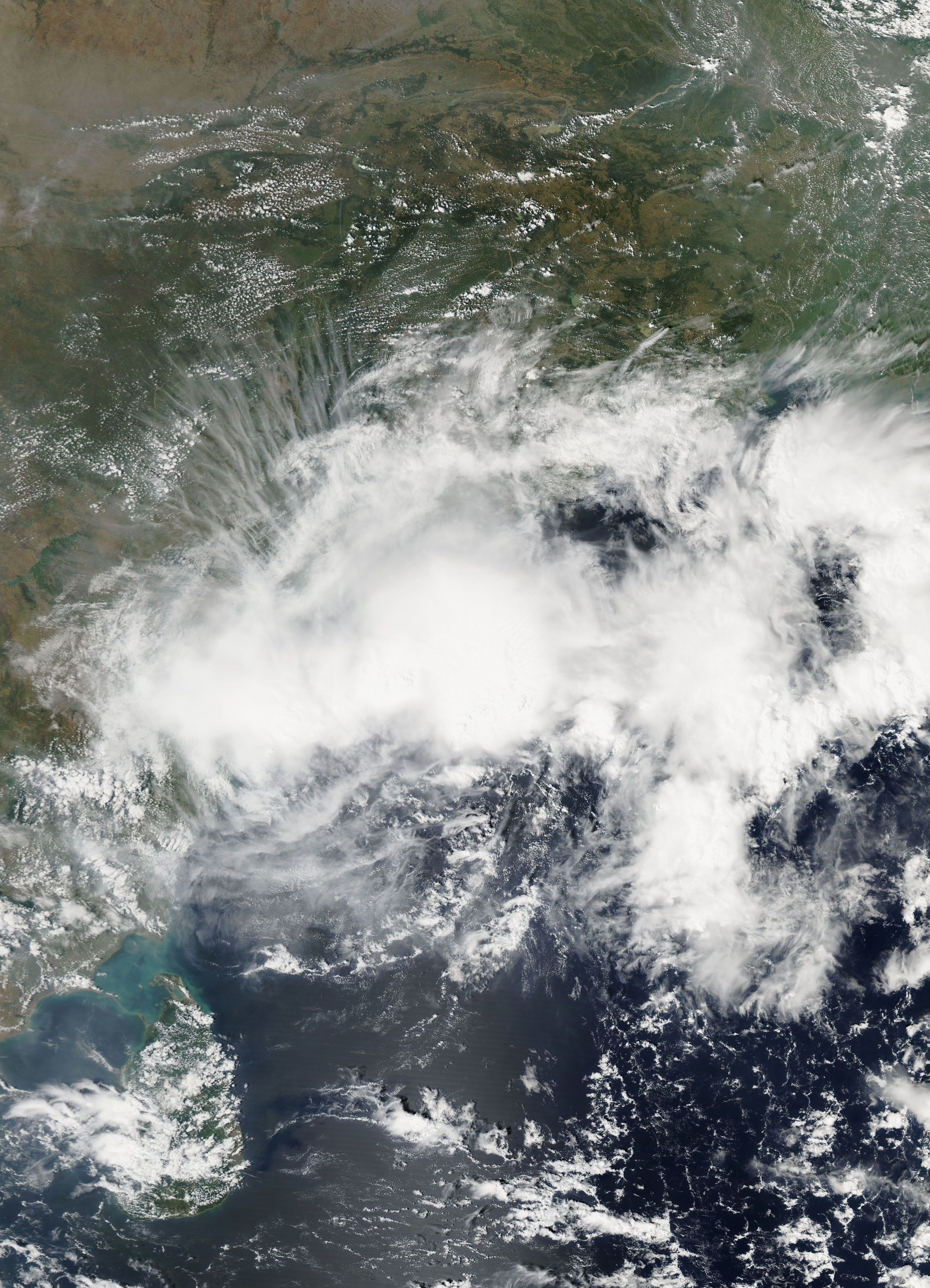
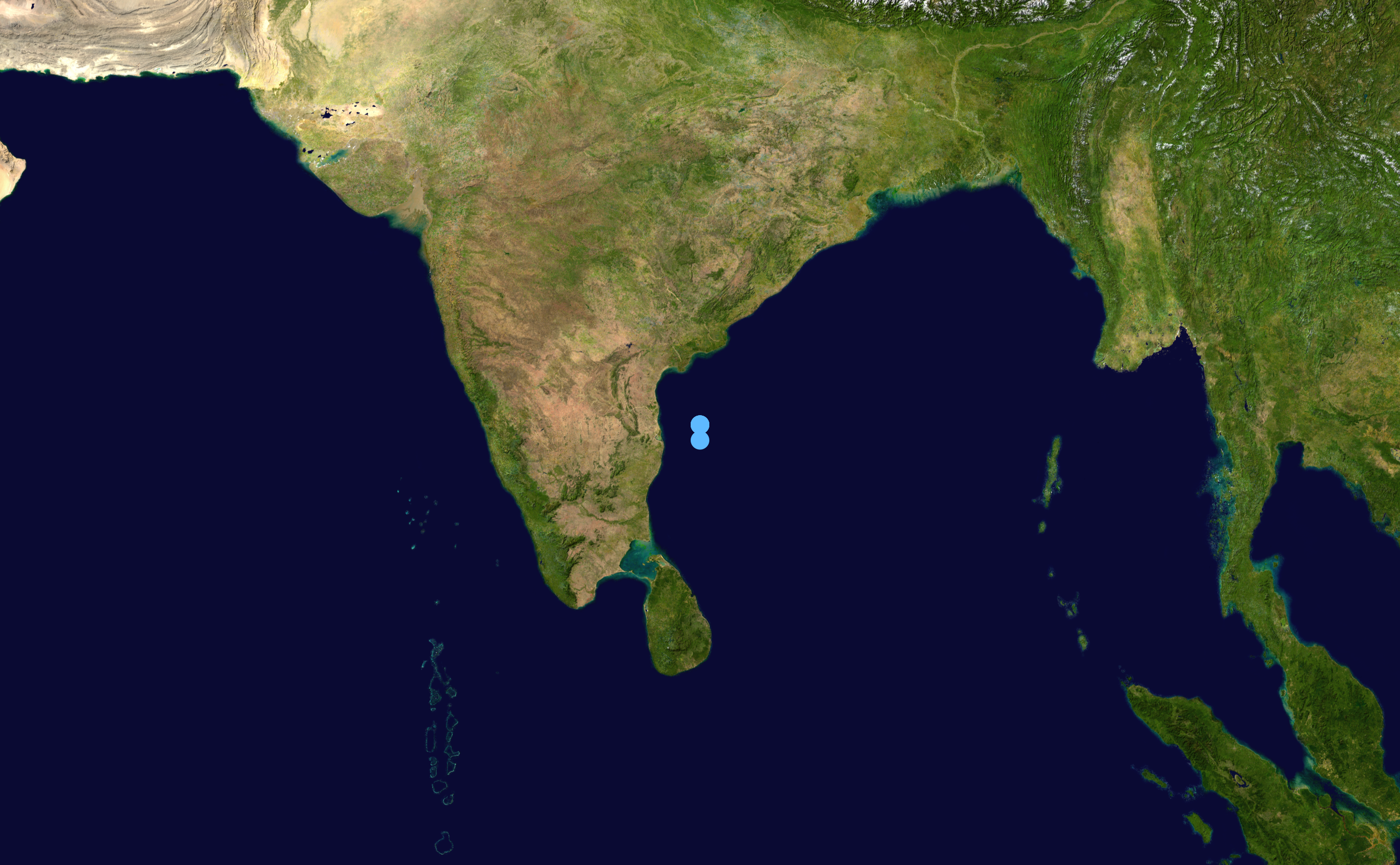
- Duration: October 22 – October 25
- Peak intensity: 45 km/h (30 mph) (3-min); 1003 hPa (mbar)

The JTWC issued a TCFA late on October 22 for a depression located about 235 km (146 mi) east-southeast of Chennai, Tamil Nadu. By 0300 UTC on the following day, the India Meteorological Department issued a bulletin on the depression. Due to multiple low-level center of circulations and an ill-defined structure, the depression was difficult to track. It moved in a quasi-stationary motion offshore Andhra Pradesh. Minimal intensification occurred, and by 1930 UTC on October 25, the depression dissipated about 235 km (146 mi) north of Chennai.

=== Severe Cyclonic Storm BOB 03 ===
- Severe cyclonic storm (IMD)
- Tropical storm (SSHWS)
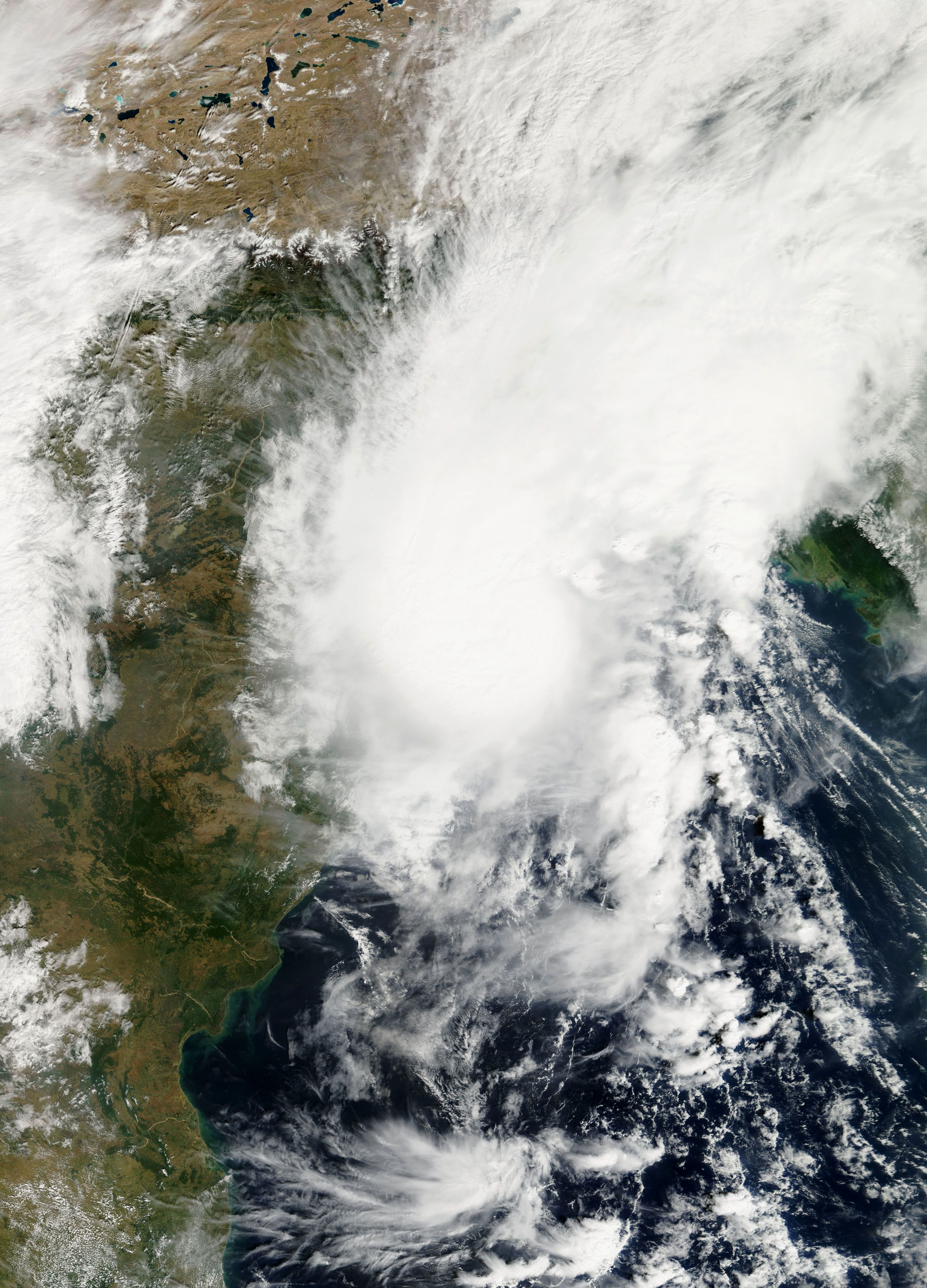
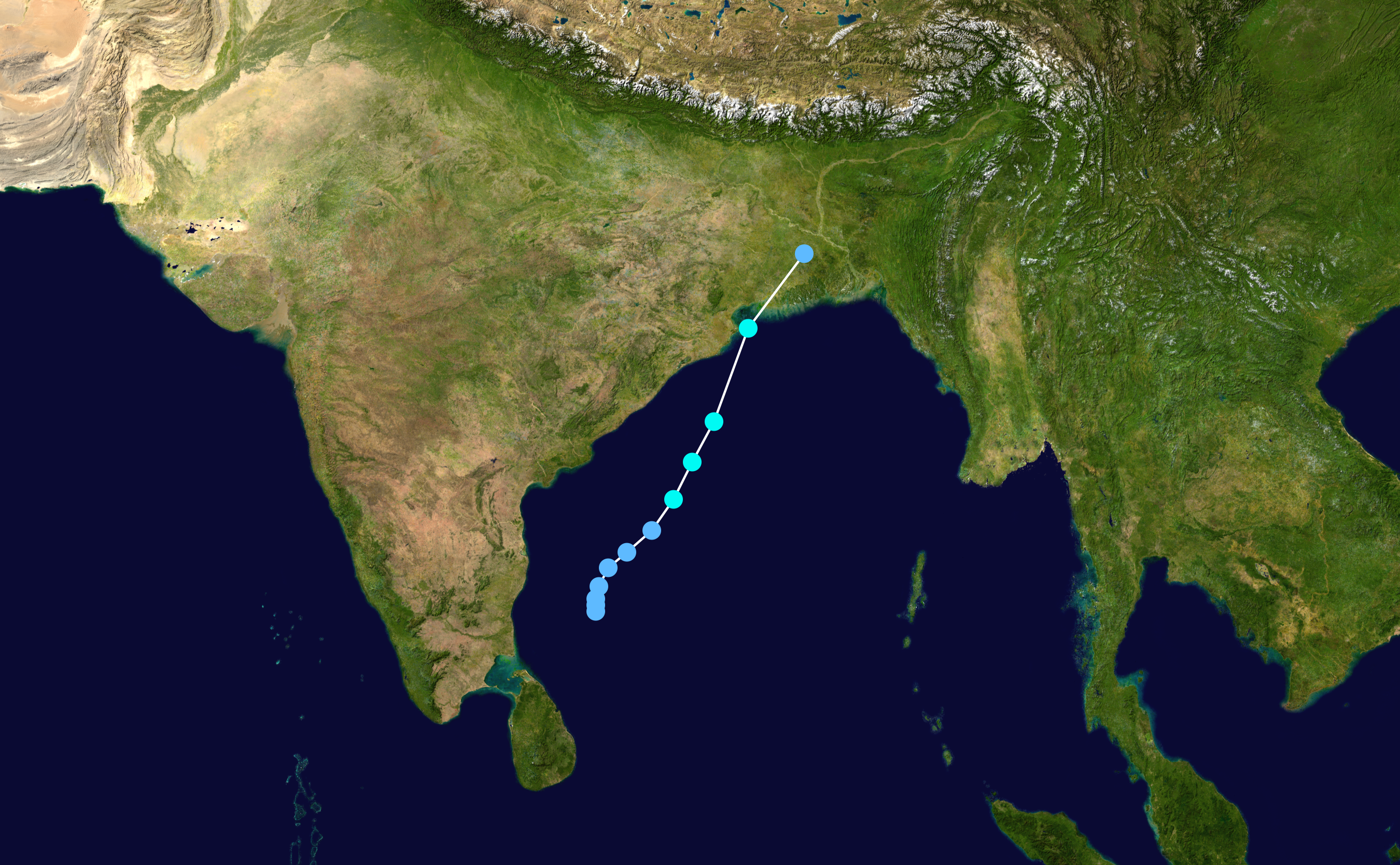
- Duration: November 10 – November 12
- Peak intensity: 100 km/h (65 mph) (3-min); 984 hPa (mbar)

Tropical Cyclone 03B developed as a depression near Chennai, India on November 10. Later that day, it intensified into a deep depression while tracking northward. As the storm was moving to the northeast, it was upgraded to a cyclonic storm, due to gale-force winds. The cyclone came under the influence of mid-latitude trough, which caused the storm to accelerate to the north-northeast. Early on November 12, it was upgraded to a severe cyclonic storm, as maximum sustained winds reached 100 km/h (62 mph). Later that day at 0900 UTC, the storm made landfall near Sagar Island, West Bengal. The cyclone quickly weakened inland and by 1200 UTC on November 12, the IMD issued its final advisory, while the system situated about 200 km (120 mi) northeast of Kolkata.

Rough seas offshore Orissa caused two fishing trawlers to collide, resulting in 18 fatalities, while two additional trawlers were reported missing. In West Bengal, the storm uprooted trees and dropped heavy rainfall, as well as causing two deaths. Strong winds and heavy rainfall in Bangladesh impacted many cities and villages, including the capital city of Dhaka, forcing thousands to evacuate. Ten wooden trawlers carrying 150 men sank offshore Bangladesh. Eight additional boats carrying 60 occupants were reported missing. Along coastal areas of the country, winds destroyed bamboo huts, uprooted trees, and disrupted road transport between various towns and villages. The storm was attributed to at least 51 deaths, while between 111 and 560 people were classified as missing.

=== Cyclonic Storm BOB 04 ===
- Cyclonic storm (IMD)
- Tropical storm (SSHWS)
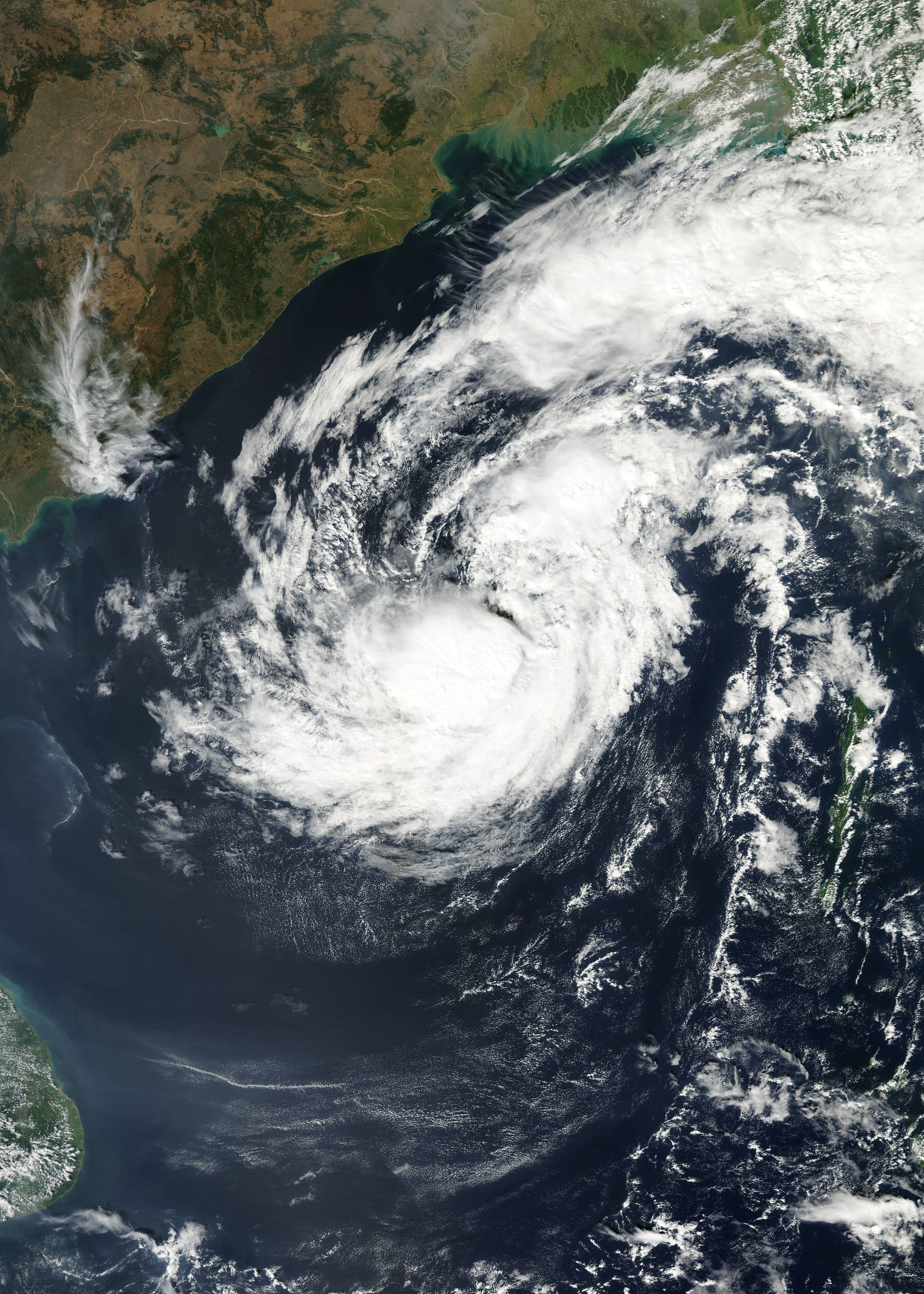
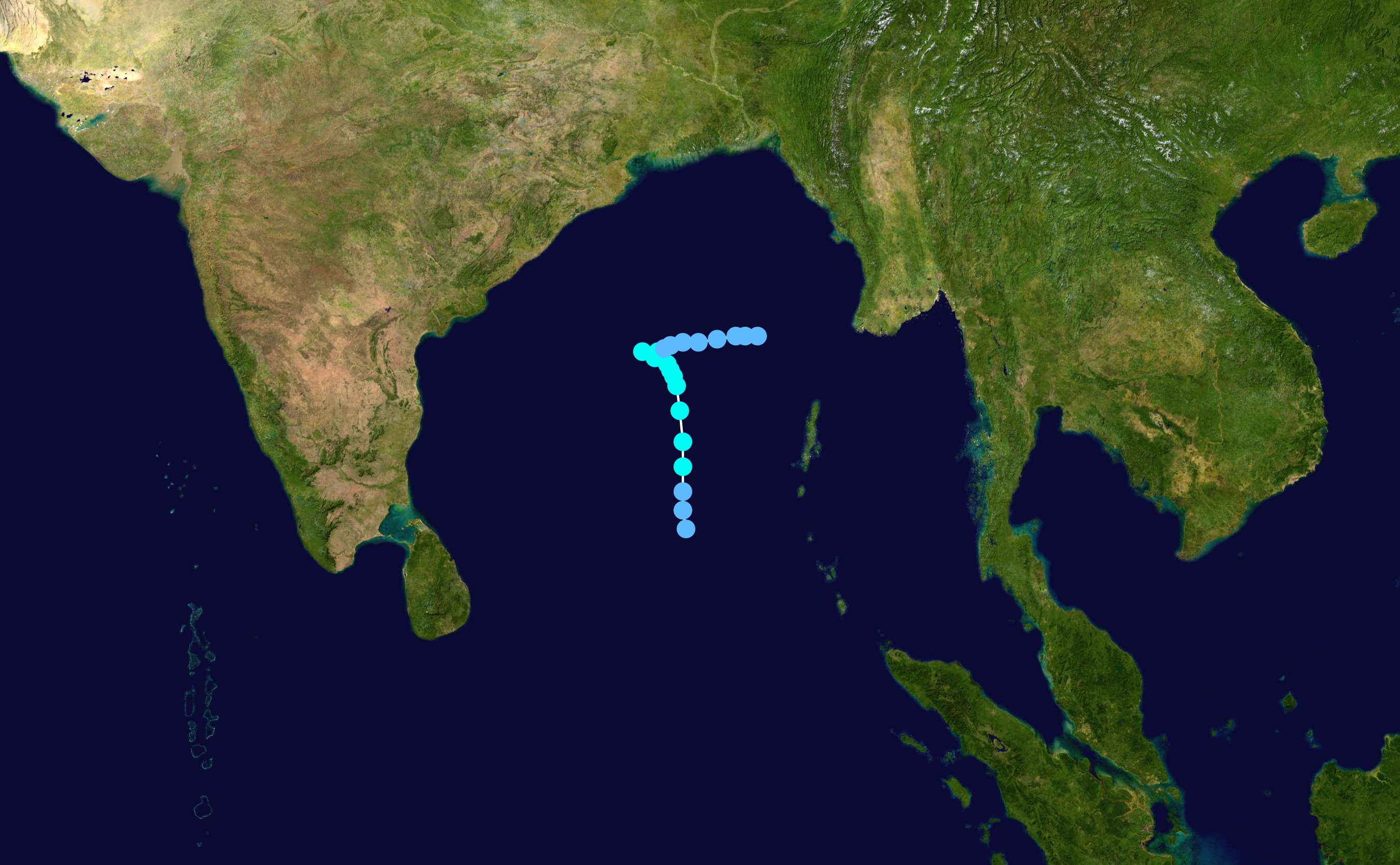
- Duration: November 23 – November 28
- Peak intensity: 85 km/h (50 mph) (1-min); 991 hPa (mbar)

A low-pressure area developed within an equatorial trough centered over the southeastern Bay of Bengal on November 22. After tracking northwestward for about twenty-four hours, the system developed into Tropical Cyclone 04B, while located about 815 km (506 mi) east-southeast of Chennai, Tamil Nadu. While moving northward, it intensified into a deep depression at 1800 UTC on November 23. Strengthening continued and early on November 24, the deep depression was upgraded to a cyclonic storm. Later that day, the storm turned northwestward and later curved westward.

As it was moving westward, the system became disorganized and the center was difficult to track. Despite significant convection, the JTWC discontinued advisories on the storm at 1200 UTC on November 25, possibly in anticipation that it would soon dissipate. However, it remained a tropical cyclone for almost three more days. By 1200 UTC on November 27, the storm was downgraded to a deep depression. The system moved northwestward and weakened further to a depression six hours later. It degenerated into an area of low-pressure area while located over the central Bay of Bengal on November 28.

=== Cyclonic Storm BOB 05 ===
- Cyclonic storm (IMD)
- Tropical storm (SSHWS)
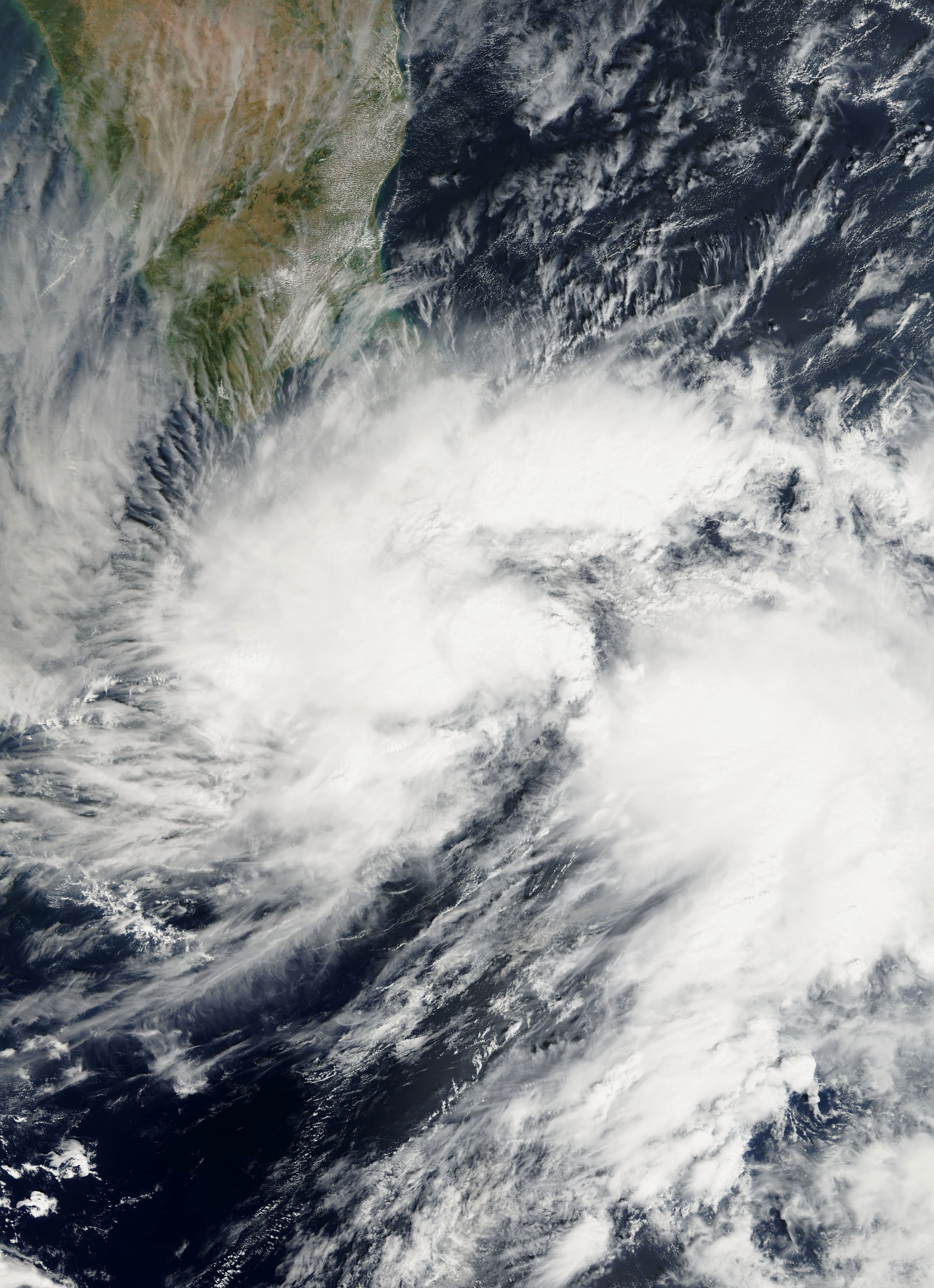
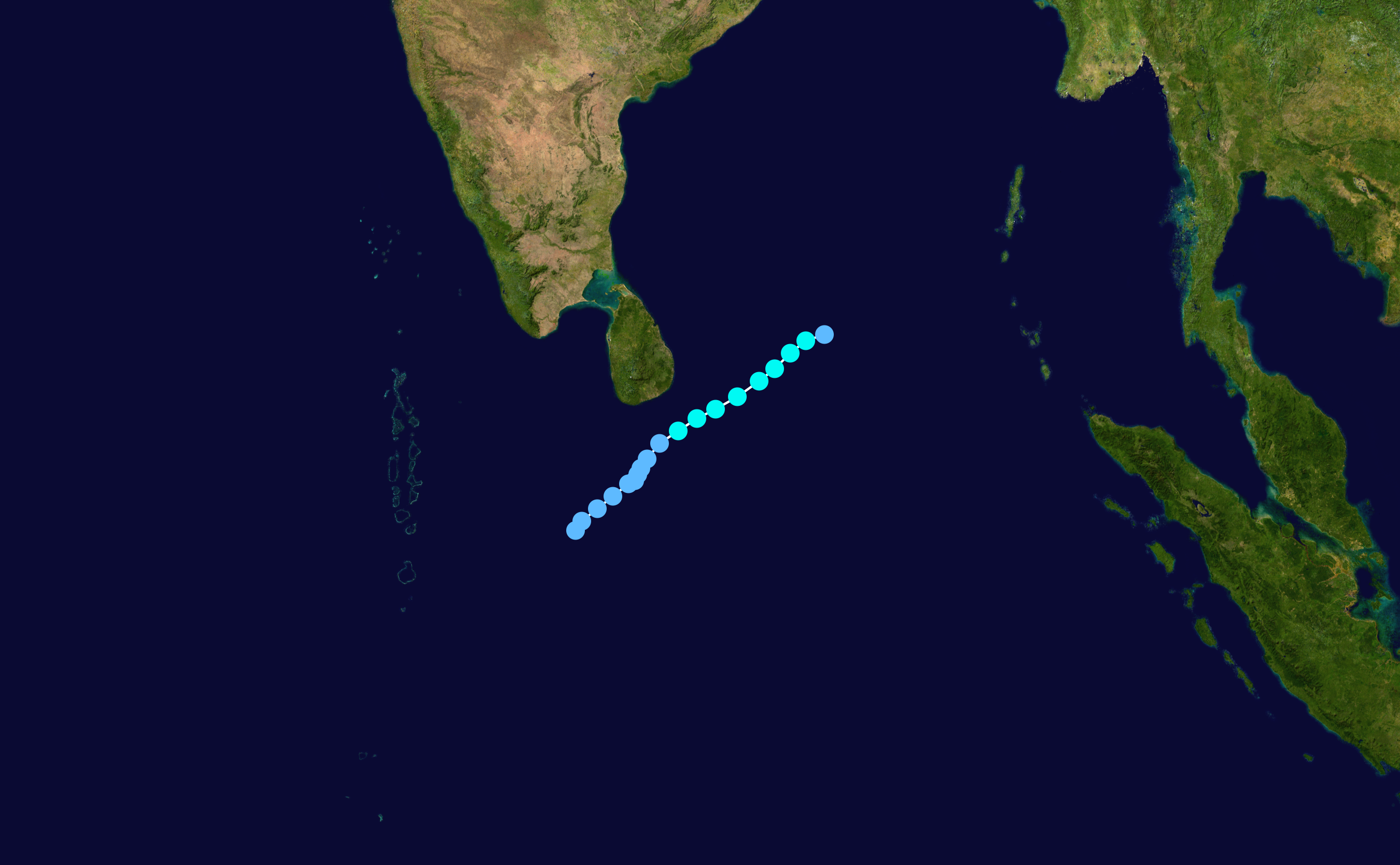
- Duration: December 21 – December 25
- Peak intensity: 65 km/h (40 mph) (1-min); 997 hPa (mbar)

A low-pressure area developed in the Intertropical Convergence Zone near Sri Lanka on December 20. Early on December 21, the system developed into a depression. The JTWC issued a TCFA at 1251 UTC on December 22, while it was centered 340 kilometres (210 mi) south-southeast of Sri Lanka. By 1800 UTC on December 23, the JTWC initiated advisories on Tropical Cyclone 05B, which was located about 160 km (99 mi) southeast of Dondra Head, Sri Lanka. At that time, the storm had intensified into a deep depression. Further strengthening occurred, and it was upgraded to a cyclonic storm early on December 24.

After peaking with maximum sustained winds of 65 km/h (40 mph) and a minimum barometric pressure of 997 mbar (29.4 inHg) on December 24, the storm soon weakened and convection diminished, possibly due to interaction with a nearby tropical disturbance. By early on the following day, it was downgraded to a deep depression while moving toward the northeast. Later that day, Cyclonic Storm BOB 06 weakened to a depression. At 1800 UTC on December 25, the JTWC issued a final advisory on the cyclone, citing that it degenerated into a remnant low-pressure area while located about 685 km (426 mi) east-southeast of Dondra Head, Sri Lanka.

== Season effects ==
This is a table of all storms in the 2002 North Indian Ocean cyclone season. It mentions all of the season's storms and their names, duration, peak intensities (according to the IMD storm scale), damage, and death totals. Damage and death totals include the damage and deaths caused when that storm was a precursor wave or extratropical low, and all of the damage figures are in 2002 USD.

Name	Dates	Peak intensity			Areas affected	Damage (USD)	Deaths	Refs
Name	Dates	Category	Wind speed	Pressure	Areas affected	Damage (USD)	Deaths	Refs
ARB 01	May 6–10	Cyclonic storm	65 km/h (40 mph)	996 hPa (29.41 inHg)	Maldives, Oman, Salalah	$25 million	9	
BOB 01	May 10–12	Deep depression	55 km/h (35 mph)	991 hPa (29.26 inHg)	None	None	None	
TD	May 17–19	Tropical depression	55 km/h (34 mph)	995 hPa (29.38 inHg)	None	None	None	
BOB 02	October 22–25	Depression	45 km/h (30 mph)	1,003 hPa (29.62 inHg)	None	None	None	
BOB 03	November 10–12	Severe cyclonic storm	100 km/h (62 mph)	984 hPa (29.06 inHg)	Bangladesh, India	None	173	
BOB 04	November 23–28	Cyclonic storm	85 km/h (55 mph)	991 hPa (29.26 inHg)	None	None	None	
BOB 05	December 21–25	Cyclonic storm	65 km/h (40 mph)	997 hPa (29.44 inHg)	None	None	None	
Season aggregates
7 systems	May 6 – December 25		100 km/h (62 mph)	984 hPa (29.06 inHg)		$25 million	182	

== See also ==
- Tropical cyclones in 2002
- 2002 Atlantic hurricane season
- 2002 Pacific hurricane season
- 2002 Pacific typhoon season
- South-West Indian Ocean cyclone seasons: 2001–02, 2002–03
- Australian region cyclone seasons: 2001–02, 2002–03
- South Pacific cyclone seasons: 2001–02, 2002–03
