= 2002 Oman cyclone =

North Indian cyclone in 2002

Cyclonic Storm ARB 01
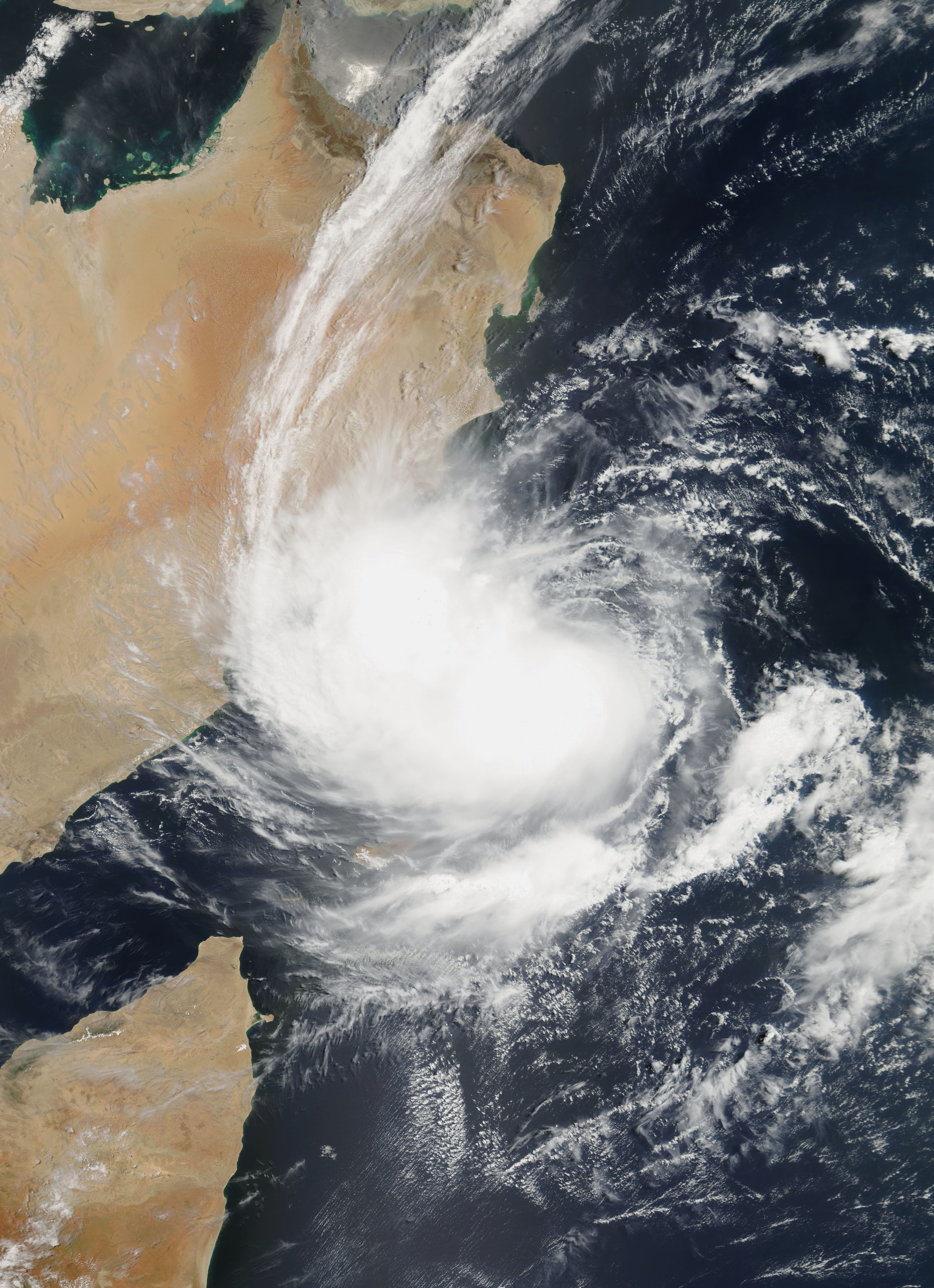
- The cyclone near peak intensity prior to landfall on May 9

Meteorological history
- Formed: May 6, 2002
- Dissipated: May 10, 2002

Cyclonic storm
- 3-minute sustained (IMD)
- Highest winds: 65 km/h (40 mph)
- Lowest pressure: 994 hPa (mbar); 29.35 inHg

Tropical storm
- 1-minute sustained (SSHWS/JTWC)
- Highest winds: 85 km/h (50 mph)
- Lowest pressure: 991 hPa (mbar); 29.26 inHg

Overall effects
- Fatalities: 9 total
- Damage: $25 million (2002 USD)
- Areas affected: Oman, Yemen
- Part of the 2002 North Indian Ocean cyclone season

The 2002 Oman cyclone (JTWC designation: 01A, officially known as Cyclonic Storm ARB 01) was a tropical cyclone that struck the Dhofar region of Oman in May 2002. The first storm of the 2002 North Indian Ocean cyclone season, it developed on May 6 in the Arabian Sea, and it maintained a general west-northwest track for much of its duration. The system reached cyclonic storm status on May 9, meaning it attained winds of greater than 65 km/h (40 mph), and on May 10 it made landfall near Salalah; shortly thereafter it dissipated. The storm was rare, in the sense that it was one of only twelve tropical cyclones on record to approach the Arabian Peninsula in the month of May.

The storm brought the heaviest number of people to Dhofar in 30 years, causing flooding and creating rivers in wadis, or typically dry riverbeds. Several people drowned after their vehicles were swept away by the flooding. The storm caused locally heavy damage, totaling $25 million (2002 USD).

== Meteorological history ==
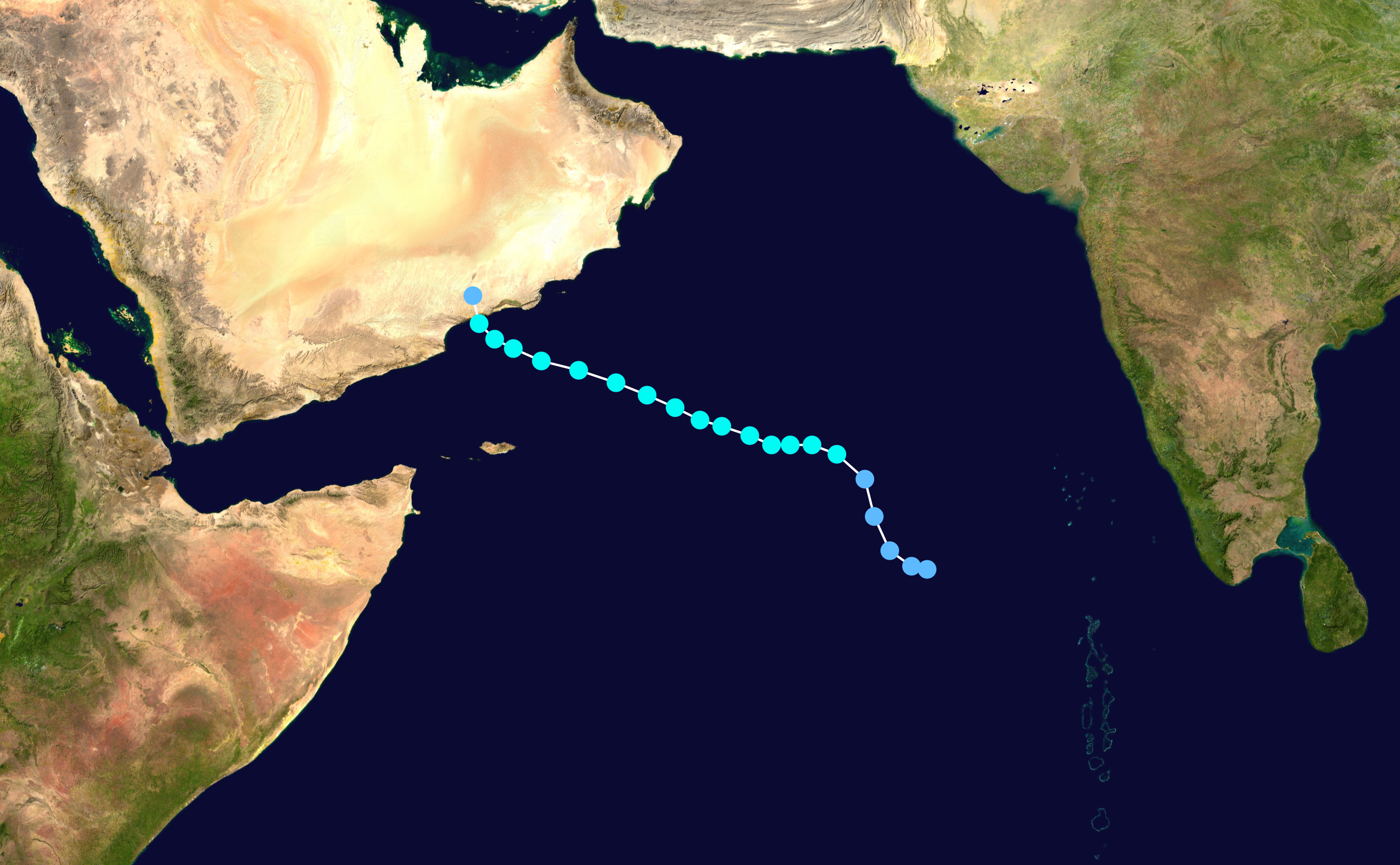
Map plotting the storm's track and intensity, according to the Saffir–Simpson scale Map key Saffir–Simpson scale Tropical depression (≤38 mph, ≤62 km/h) Tropical storm (39–73 mph, 63–118 km/h) Category 1 (74–95 mph, 119–153 km/h) Category 2 (96–110 mph, 154–177 km/h) Category 3 (111–129 mph, 178–208 km/h) Category 4 (130–156 mph, 209–251 km/h) Category 5 (≥157 mph, ≥252 km/h) Unknown Storm type Tropical cyclone Subtropical cyclone Extratropical cyclone, remnant low, tropical disturbance, or monsoon depression

An area of convection developed on May 2, 2002 near Sri Lanka, associated with a weak and broad circulation center. The system tracked west-northwestward through the Arabian Sea along a trough near the equator. Its thunderstorm activity was enhanced by a ridge to its north, though was also removed from the center. By May 5, the circulation had become better defined, and concurrently the convection increased over the center. After further organization, the India Meteorological Department (IMD) classified the system as Depression ARB01A on May 6. Around the same time, the Joint Typhoon Warning Center (JTWC) classified it as Tropical Depression 01A, while located about 1,300 km (810 mi) southeast of Salalah, Oman.

After becoming a tropical cyclone, the depression turned to a northwest motion before resuming a track to the west-northwest. On May 7 it intensified into a deep depression, and though its winds had increased, the structure became disorganized as the center became exposed from the thunderstorm activity. The convection waned, due to the influence of dry air from the Arabian Peninsula, as well as from wind shear. As a result, the IMD downgraded it to depression status early on May 8. However, later in the day, convection redeveloped over the western half of the circulation, and it again reached deep depression status, about 830 km (520 mi) southeast of Oman.

The storm maintained poleward outflow as it continued west-northwestward. Early on May 9 the IMD upgraded the system to a cyclonic storm, estimating winds of 65 km/h (40 mph) and a pressure of 994 mbar (29.4 inHg). Around that time, the storm was estimated by the JTWC to have attained peak winds of 85 km/h (50 km/h), with an atmospheric pressure of 991 mbar. While located a short distance offshore, the storm turned to the northwest and weakened slightly. At about 0900 UTC on May 10, the storm made landfall near Salalah, Oman. Shortly thereafter, it began dissipation over Oman. Its landfall in the Dhofar region of Oman was uncommon; in the period from 1891 to 1990, only 17 tropical depressions or storms struck the region.

== Impact ==
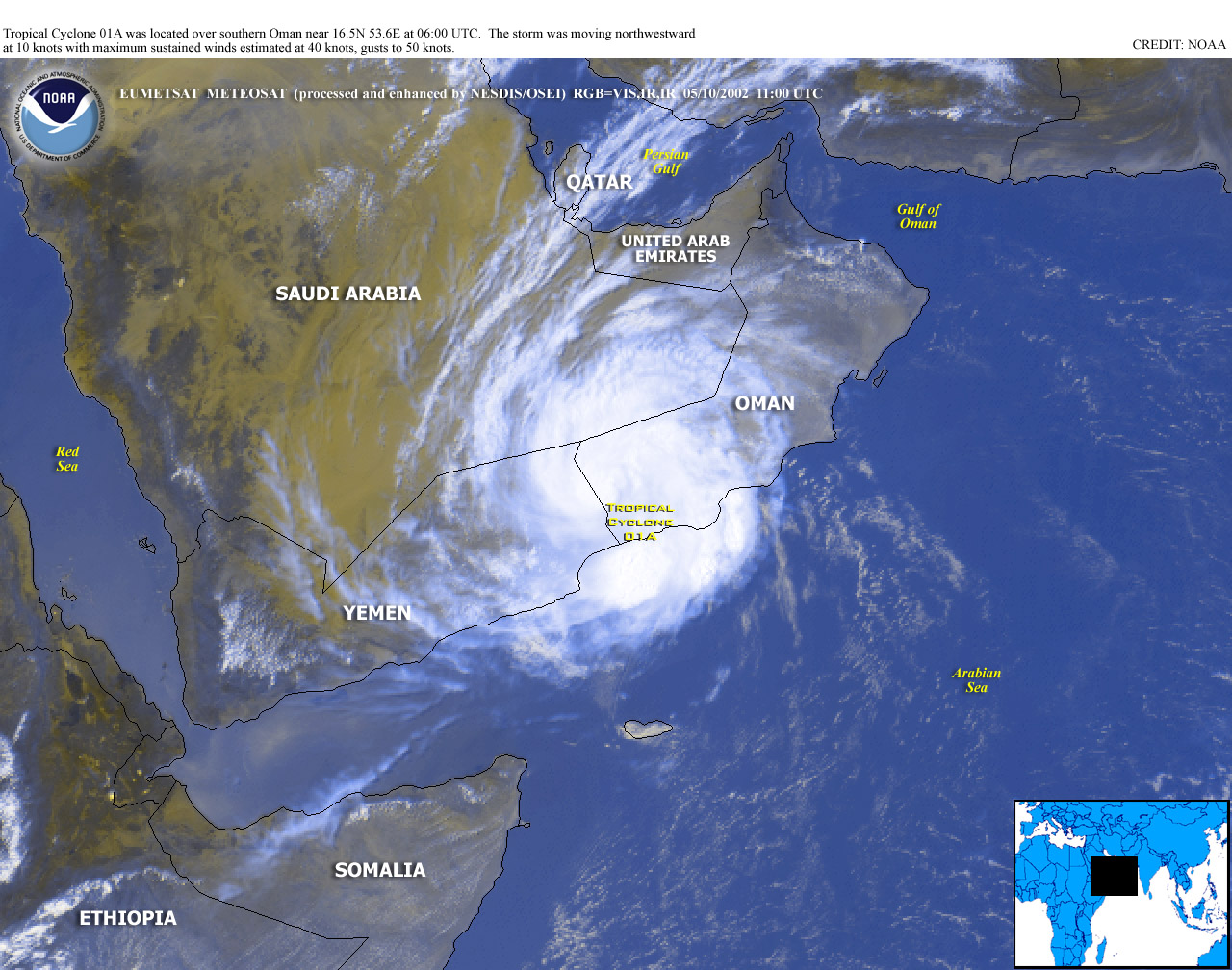
Satellite image after landfall

Along the coastline, the arrival of the storm resulted in strong waves of up to 4 metres (13 feet). The storm dropped heavy rainfall in the vicinity of its landfall, which were the greatest totals in 30 years in the Dhofar region. The city of Salalah reported 58 mm (2.3 in) in a 24‑hour period as the storm moved ashore, which was more than 300% of its average monthly for May. As a result, some flooding was reported in the city, and several wadis, or typically dry riverbeds, became sudden rivers in the area; one station recorded a discharge of 1146 m^{3}/s (40,470 ft^{3}/s). In Qairoon, precipitation amounted to 251 mm (9.9 in), which was the highest total in Oman. Severe thunderstorms were reported during its passage, with wind gusts peaking at 106 km/h (66 mph). In neighboring Yemen, the city of Al Ghaydah reported light winds of about 45 km/h (30 mph).

Damage was severe and widespread, estimated at $25 million (2002 USD). Storm impact included property, crop, transportation, and agricultural damage, with hundreds of cattle drowning during the passage of the storm. Across the Dhofar region of Oman, the storm caused several injuries and a total of nine fatalities; most of the deaths were drownings, occurring when their vehicles were swept away by flooding in typically dry areas. Two army soldiers and one police officer drowned while saving other people in danger.

In the aftermath of the storm, the Omani government received 4,000 requests for assistance, and in turn provided financial aid to 500 families; additionally, the government supplied temporary housing for displaced people.

== See also ==
- List of Arabian Peninsula tropical cyclones
- 1996 Oman cyclone
