= Cyclone Hary =

South-West Indian Ocean cyclone in 2002

Very Intense Tropical Cyclone Hary
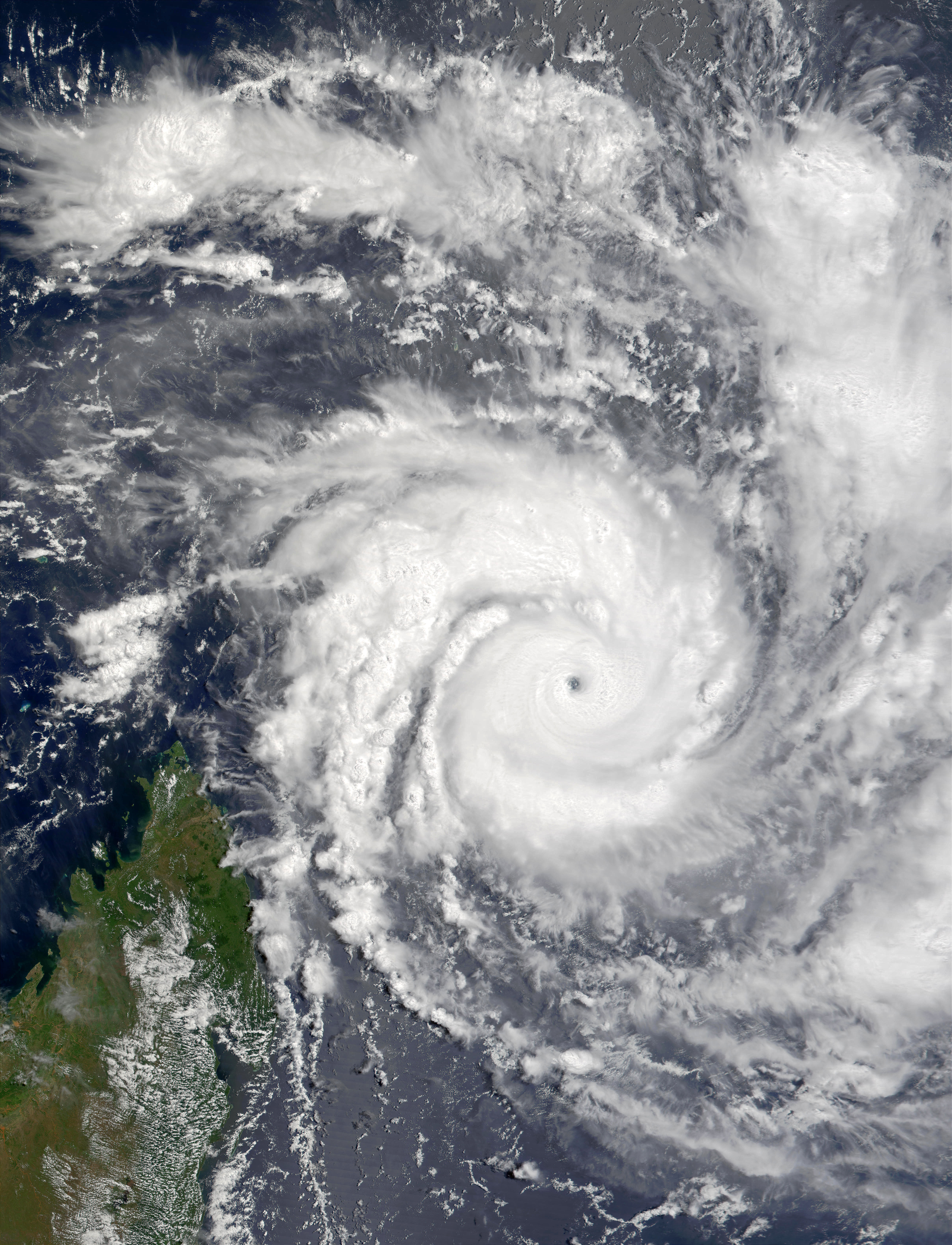
- Cyclone Hary on 8 March

Meteorological history
- Formed: 5 March 2002
- Extratropical: 13 March 2002
- Dissipated: 17 March 2002

Very intense tropical cyclone
- 10-minute sustained (MFR)
- Highest winds: 220 km/h (140 mph)
- Lowest pressure: 905 hPa (mbar); 26.72 inHg

Category 5-equivalent tropical cyclone
- 1-minute sustained (SSHWS/JTWC)
- Highest winds: 260 km/h (160 mph)
- Lowest pressure: 898 hPa (mbar); 26.52 inHg

Overall effects
- Fatalities: 4 direct
- Areas affected: Madagascar, Réunion, Mauritius
- IBTrACS
- Part of the 2001–02 South-West Indian Ocean cyclone season

Very Intense Tropical Cyclone Hary was the strongest tropical cyclone in the 2001–02 South-West Indian Ocean cyclone season. Developing on 5 March from a monsoon trough, the storm initially moved generally to the west and gradually intensified. With favorable conditions, Hary quickly intensified on 7 March, developing an eye and well-defined outflow. After reaching an initial peak, the cyclone briefly weakened due to an eyewall replacement cycle, by which time the storm turned southwestward toward Madagascar. Hary re-intensified and attained peak winds of 220 km/h (140 mph) on 10 March just offshore eastern Madagascar, which made it the first very intense tropical cyclone since 2000.

After peaking, Hary weakened due to land interaction, and it struck Madagascar southeast of Antalaha. It was turning south over land, and as a result it quickly moved offshore. There were three deaths in the country, one of which from electrocution. There was locally heavy crop damage, and four bridges were destroyed. However, the damage was considered minimal, given the intensity of the storm. After affecting Madagascar, Hary accelerated to the southeast, and the eastern periphery of the circulation moved over Réunion. On the mountain peaks of the island, rainfall reached 1,344 mm (52.9 in), although it was much less near the coast. The rainfall caused flooding, killing one person, and 20,000 people were left without power. Hary became extratropical on 13 March, although its remnants continued for several days as a powerful mid-latitude storm.

== Meteorological history ==
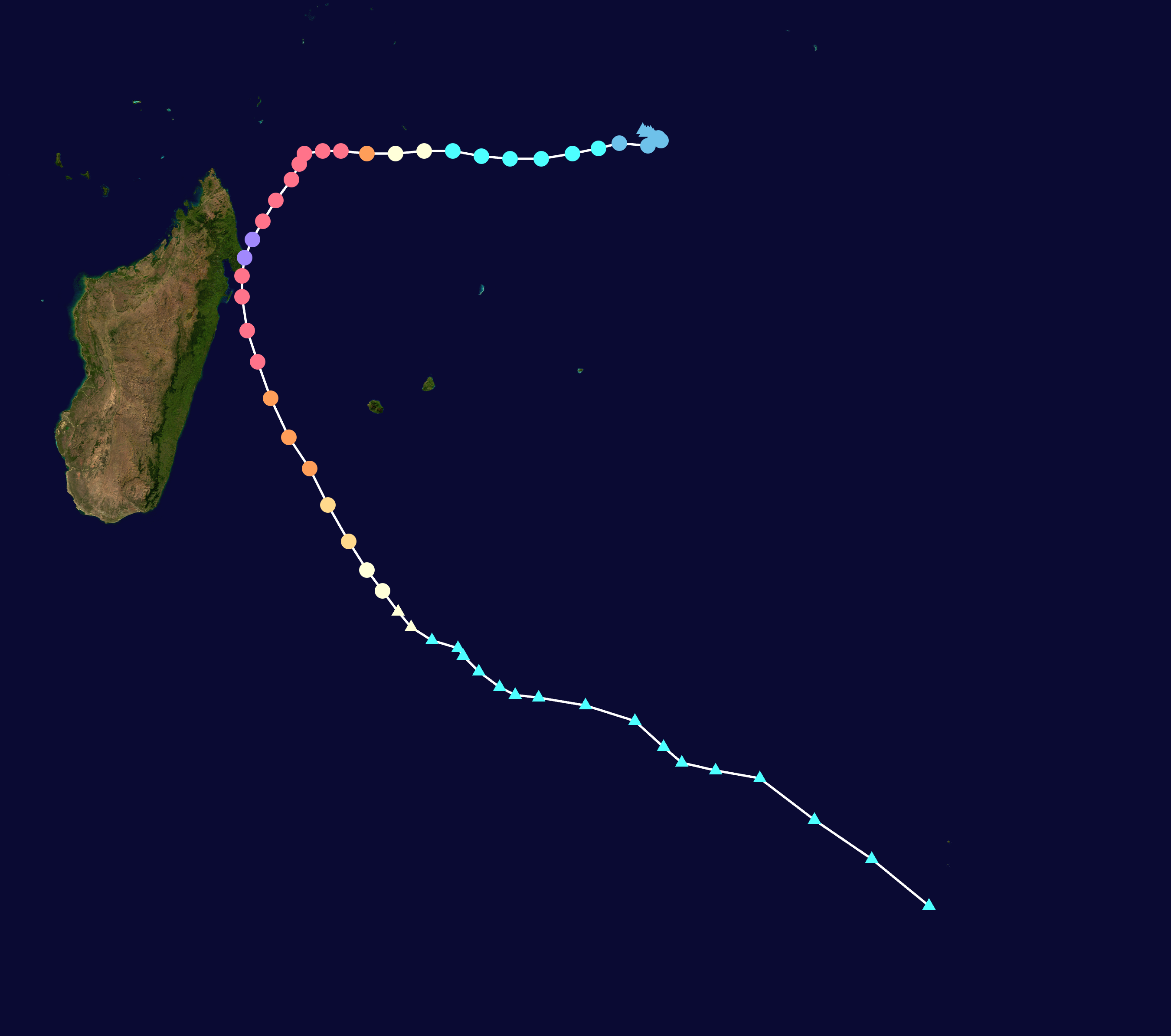
Map plotting the storm's track and intensity, according to the Saffir–Simpson scale Map key Saffir–Simpson scale Tropical depression (≤38 mph, ≤62 km/h) Tropical storm (39–73 mph, 63–118 km/h) Category 1 (74–95 mph, 119–153 km/h) Category 2 (96–110 mph, 154–177 km/h) Category 3 (111–129 mph, 178–208 km/h) Category 4 (130–156 mph, 209–251 km/h) Category 5 (≥157 mph, ≥252 km/h) Unknown Storm type Tropical cyclone Subtropical cyclone Extratropical cyclone, remnant low, tropical disturbance, or monsoon depression

In early March 2002, tropical activity was minimal in the southern Indian Ocean, limited to an area of convection, or thunderstorms, located southwest of Diego Garcia along the monsoon. On 4 March, a broad and elongated low pressure area developed within the system, although moderate wind shear in the region initially prevented significant development. The next day, the circulation became better defined, and after being nearly stationary for a few days, it began moving steadily to the west-southwest, due to a ridge to the southeast. On 5 March, Météo-France (MFR) classified the system as a tropical disturbance, and later Tropical Depression 11. At 0000 UTC on 6 March, the Joint Typhoon Warning Center (JTWC) initiated advisories on Tropical Cyclone 18S, and six hours later MFR upgraded the system to Moderate Tropical Storm Hary.

After becoming a tropical storm, Hary was located beneath an anticyclone and in an area of minimal wind shear. It turned to a general westward motion, with its convection wrapping into the center and developing into a central dense overcast. A ragged eye formed on 7 March, which gradually became more organized. That day, the JTWC upgraded Hary to the equivalent of a minimal hurricane, with 1 minute winds of 120 km/h (75 mph). By that time, the storm had developed good outflow, and was in the midst of a period of rapid deepening. Early on 8 March, MFR upgraded Hary to tropical cyclone status, and the storm became very compact, with gales extending only 75 km (47 mi) from the center. While rounding the northwest edge of a ridge, Hary turned to the southwest late on 8 March, towards the northeast coast of Madagascar. After reaching 10 minute sustained winds of 205 km/h (127 mph), Hary weakened slightly due to an eyewall replacement cycle, which resulted in the eye becoming indistinct until it was replaced by a larger outer eyewall. After the new eye formed, the cyclone again intensified, and Hary became a very intense tropical cyclone early on 10 March, with peak 10-minute winds of 220 km/h (140 mph), according to the MF. It was the first very intense tropical cyclone since Cyclone Hudah in 2000, and made Hary the strongest storm of the season. Around that time, the JTWC estimated that Hary attained peak 1 minute winds of 260 km/h (160 mph).

Around the time of its peak intensity, Hary was located about 70 km (43 mi) off the east coast of Madagascar. While approaching the coast, the cyclone was turning toward the south, although its motion was not southerly enough to keep the storm offshore. At around 1200 UTC on 10 March, Hary made landfall about 55 km (34 mi) southeast of Antalaha, slightly below peak intensity. The eye rapidly weakened before landfall, possibly due to another replacement cycle, and land interaction further deteriorated the storm. By late on 10 March, MFR downgraded Hary to tropical cyclone status, with winds of 160 km/h (99 mph), about 50 km (31 mi) east of Île Sainte-Marie. Subsequently, Hary turned more toward the south-southeast, steered by an approaching trough that increased wind shear. The cyclone stopped weakening, and the eye began redeveloping. Early on 12 March, Hary passed about 350 km (220 mi) west of the French island of Réunion, when the JTWC estimated its 1-minute winds were about 185 km/h (115 mph). Later that day, the combination of increasing wind shear and cooler waters weakened the cyclone, resulting in the cloud structure to deteriorate. After the circulation became fully exposed from the convection, MFR estimated Hary became extratropical around 1200 UTC on 13 March. The circulation expanded greatly afterward as the storm continued generally to the southeast. The remnants of Hary re-intensified on 17 March while passing about 250 km (160 mi) southwest of Île Amsterdam in the south-central Indian Ocean. It moved south of the 40th parallel south, and continued as a powerful storm in the westerlies.

== Impact ==
Cyclone Hary passed about 100 km (62 mi) south of the Agalega Islands on 7 March, producing winds of only 37 km/h (23 mph); this was due to the cyclone's small size.

On 9 March, as Hary intensified to the northeast of Madagascar, officials in Antsiranana Province placed the area under a state of alert. The following day, the storm clipped the eastern portion of the province as a Very Intense Tropical Cyclone, with maximum winds estimated at 220 km/h (140 mph). While passing near Île Sainte-Marie, the storm produced a wind gust of 83 km/h (52 mph), although the storm was weakening and located east of the island at the time. Hary dropped heavy rainfall in eastern Madagascar, and a 24‑hour peak of 243 mm (9.6 in) was reported in Tamatave. Initially, communication difficulties prevented reports of damage from leaving the region. Despite the intensity of the storm, overall damage was minimal, and much less than predicted. Two bridges were destroyed each in Antalaha District and Fenoarivo Atsinanana. Further south in Toamasina, high winds downed telephone lines and cut communications. Hary destroyed a hospital, and along its path it severely damaged food crops. One person died from electrocution, and there were three deaths overall in the country.

Although the center of Cyclone Hary passed well to the west of Réunion, heavy rains associated with the storm caused significant flooding on the island. The cyclone began affecting the island when it was located over Madagascar, after the large circulation spread humid air to the area and produced heavy rainfall through orographic lift. Over a 12‑hour span, 134 mm (5.3 in) fell in La Plaine-des-Palmistes, and the highest rainfall was 1,344 mm (52.9 in) in Bébourg during the storm's passage. The heaviest rainfall occurred at high altitudes, and along the coast, rainfall reached about 372 mm (14.6 in) in Saint-Philippe. These rains caused the Ravine du Chaudron to swell and flood nearby Saint-Denis. One person drowned after attempting to cross the swollen river. Several roads were washed out across the region, cutting off Cilaos from nearby areas. High winds, peaking at 173 km/h (107 mph), associated with Hary's passage left approximately 20,000 residences without power. Hary also produced 5 m (16 ft) waves during its passage. There was no major damage on Réunion, which was still recovering from the deadly Cyclone Dina two months prior. Rainfall from Hary spread to nearby Mauritius, although effects there were not as severe.

== See also ==
- Tropical cyclones in 2002
- Weather of 2002
- Tropical cyclones in the Mascarene Islands
- Cyclone Gafilo (2004) – similarly intense cyclone that struck northeastern Madagascar
- Cyclone Indlala (2007) – a slightly weaker but deadlier tropical cyclone which also struck northeastern Madagascar
