= 2001–02 South-West Indian Ocean cyclone season =

Cyclone season in the Southwest Indian Ocean

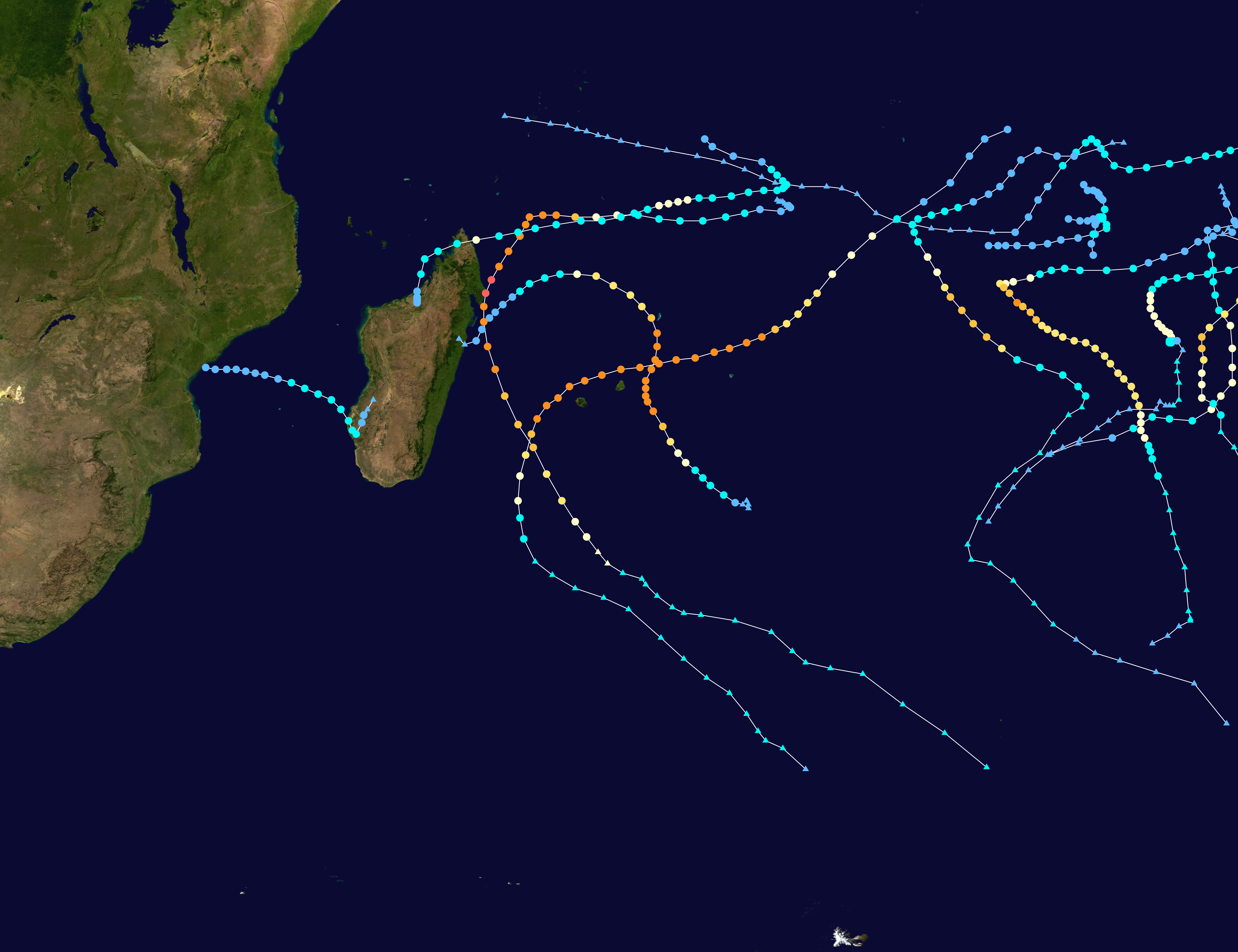
- Season summary map

Seasonal boundaries
- First system formed: October 3, 2001
- Last system dissipated: June 15, 2002

Strongest storm
- Name: Hary
  - Maximum winds: 220 km/h (140 mph) (10-minute sustained)
  - Lowest pressure: 905 hPa (mbar)

Seasonal statistics
- Total disturbances: 15
- Total depressions: 13
- Total storms: 11
- Tropical cyclones: 9
- Intense tropical cyclones: 5
- Very intense tropical cyclones: 1
- Total fatalities: 52 total
- Total damage: $287 million (2002 USD)

Related articles
- 2001–02 Australian region cyclone season; 2001–02 South Pacific cyclone season

The 2001–02 South-West Indian Ocean cyclone season had the earliest named storm since 1992. Many storms formed in the north-east portion of the basin, and several more originated around Australia. The basin is defined as the waters of the Indian Ocean west of longitude 90°E to the coast of Africa and south of the equator. Eleven tropical storms formed, compared to an average of nine. Tropical systems were present during 73 days, which was significantly higher than the average of 58 for this basin.

Tropical cyclones in this basin are monitored by the Regional Specialized Meteorological Center (RSMC) in Réunion. The season started on November 1, 2001, and ended on April 30, 2002; for Mauritius and the Seychelles, the season continued until May 15. These dates conventionally delimit the period of each year when most tropical cyclones form in the basin; however, storms formed both before and after the designated season. The first storm was Andre, which emerged from the Australian basin as Tropical Cyclone Alex in late October. The strongest storm, Cyclone Hary, was the first very intense tropical cyclone since 2000; it hit Madagascar, where it caused lighter damage than expected but three deaths. In January, Cyclone Dina left heavy damage in the Mascarene Islands, particularly on Réunion, where it dropped 2,102 mm (82.8 in) of rainfall. The second-to-last storm was Cyclone Kesiny, which killed 33 people when it struck Madagascar in the midst of a political crisis.

== Season summary ==
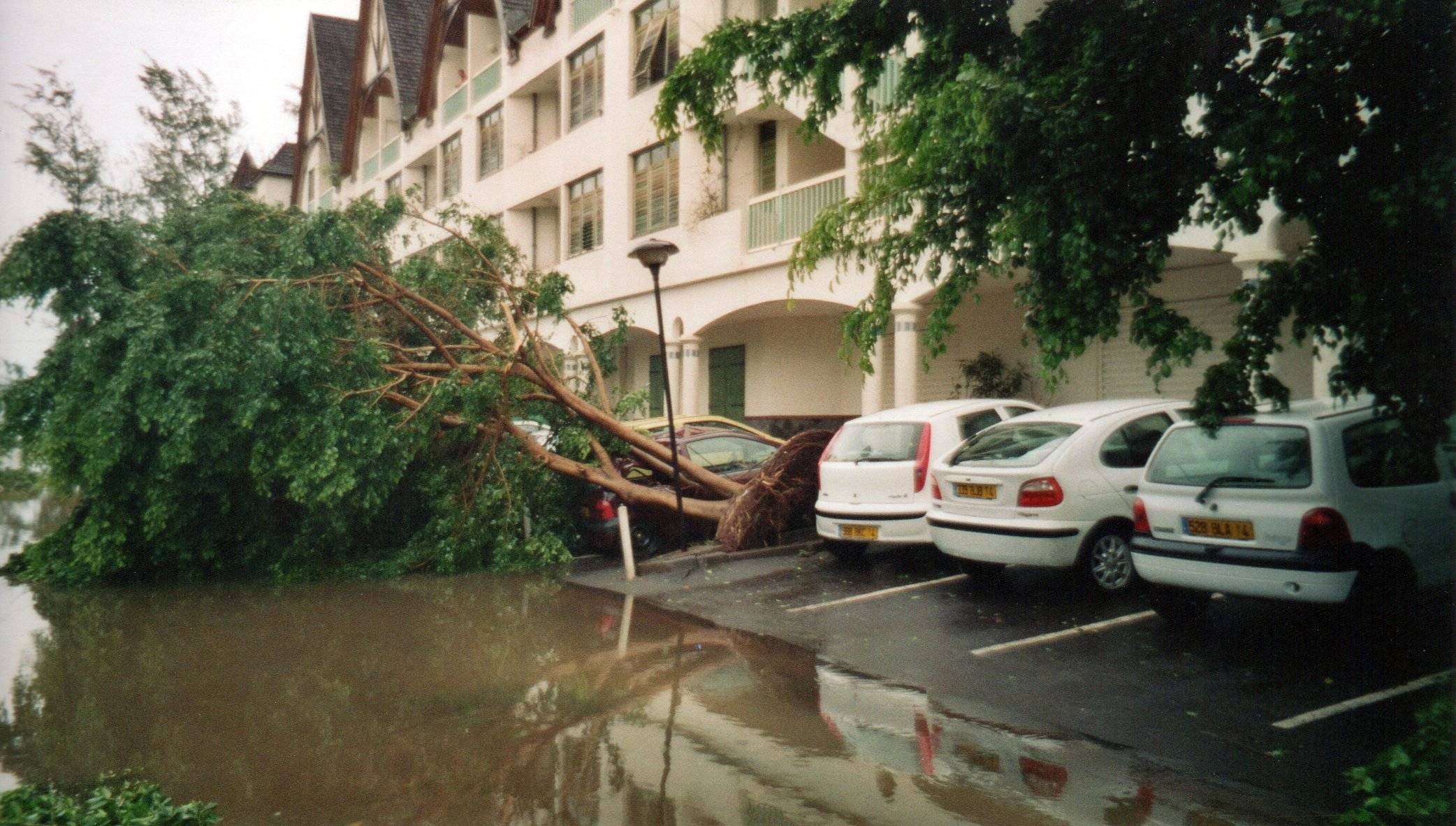
A downed tree and street flooding from Cyclone Dina on Réunion

Météo-France's meteorological office in Réunion (MFR) is the official Regional Specialized Meteorological Center for the South-West Indian Ocean, tracking all tropical cyclones from the east coast of Africa to 90° E. The Joint Typhoon Warning Center (JTWC), which is a joint United States Navy – United States Air Force task force that issues tropical cyclone warnings for the region, also issued advisories for storms during the season. Following the season, the start of the tropical cyclone year was changed to July 1, which defines the boundary between tropical cyclone seasons.

Although the previous season was tame, the 2001–02 season was very active and featured several intense tropical cyclones. During the season, eleven systems were named, which was slightly above the average of nine. However, nine of the systems attained cyclone intensity, the second highest total in 30 years. In terms of both the number of systems and number of "cyclone days", the season was considered comparable by MFR to the 1993–94 season. In this season, there were 73 days on which tropical cyclones were active, which was more than twice as much as the previous season and 19 days above the average. A system of cyclone intensity was active on 35 days, which was 15 days above the mean. Additionally, five of the systems attained "intense tropical cyclone" status, including one – Hary – that attained the "very intense tropical cyclone" stage. Activity was relatively distributed throughout the season and had the earliest start since 1992. Like most seasons within the basin, activity reached a climax in late January. Several systems during the season developed in the eastern portion of the basin, similar to 1993–94; unlike that season, many storms in 2001–02 stayed at sea throughout their lifetime, thus reducing casualties and damage.

== Systems ==
=== Tropical Depression 01 ===
- Tropical depression (MFR)
- Tropical storm (SSHWS)
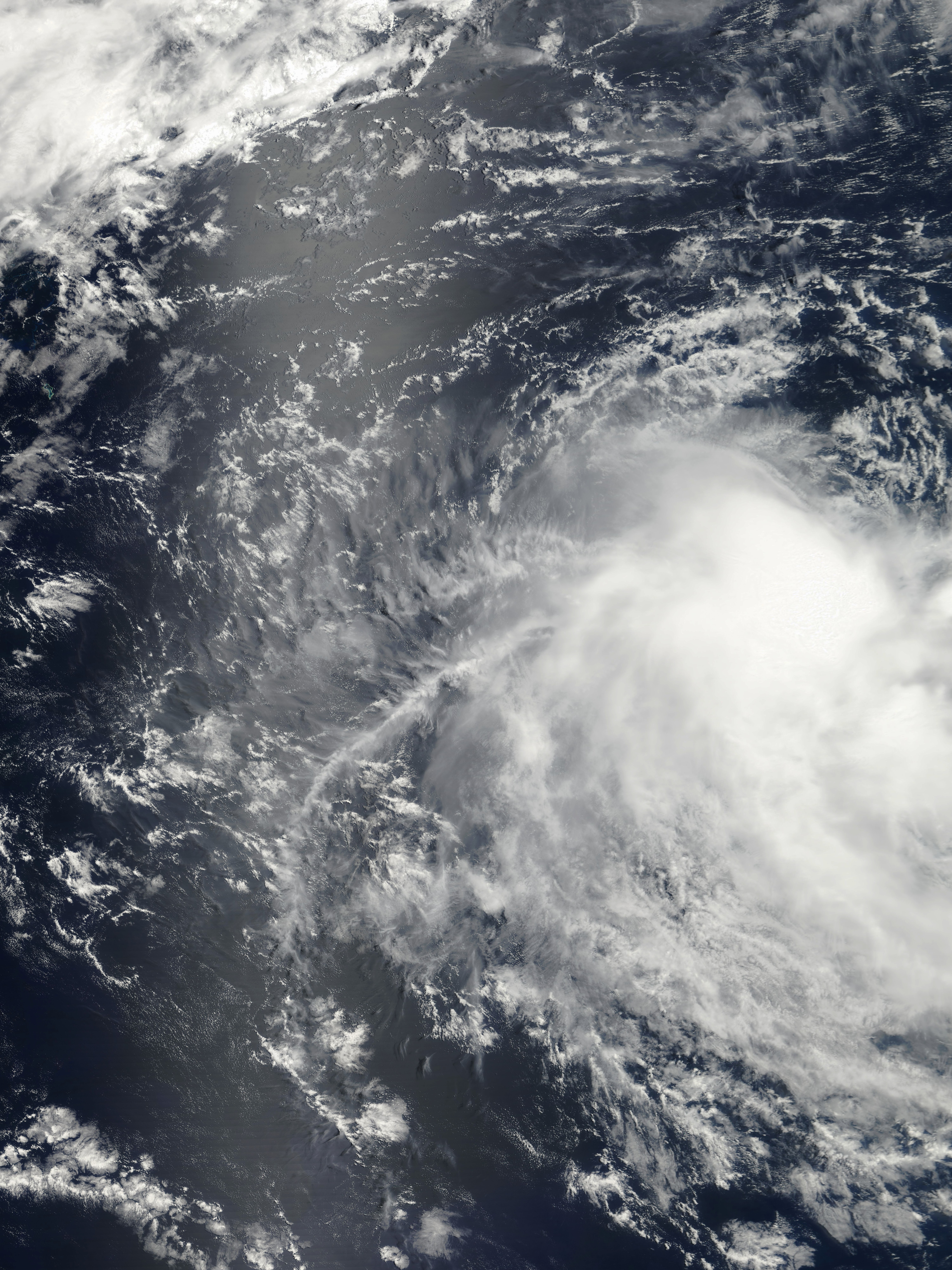
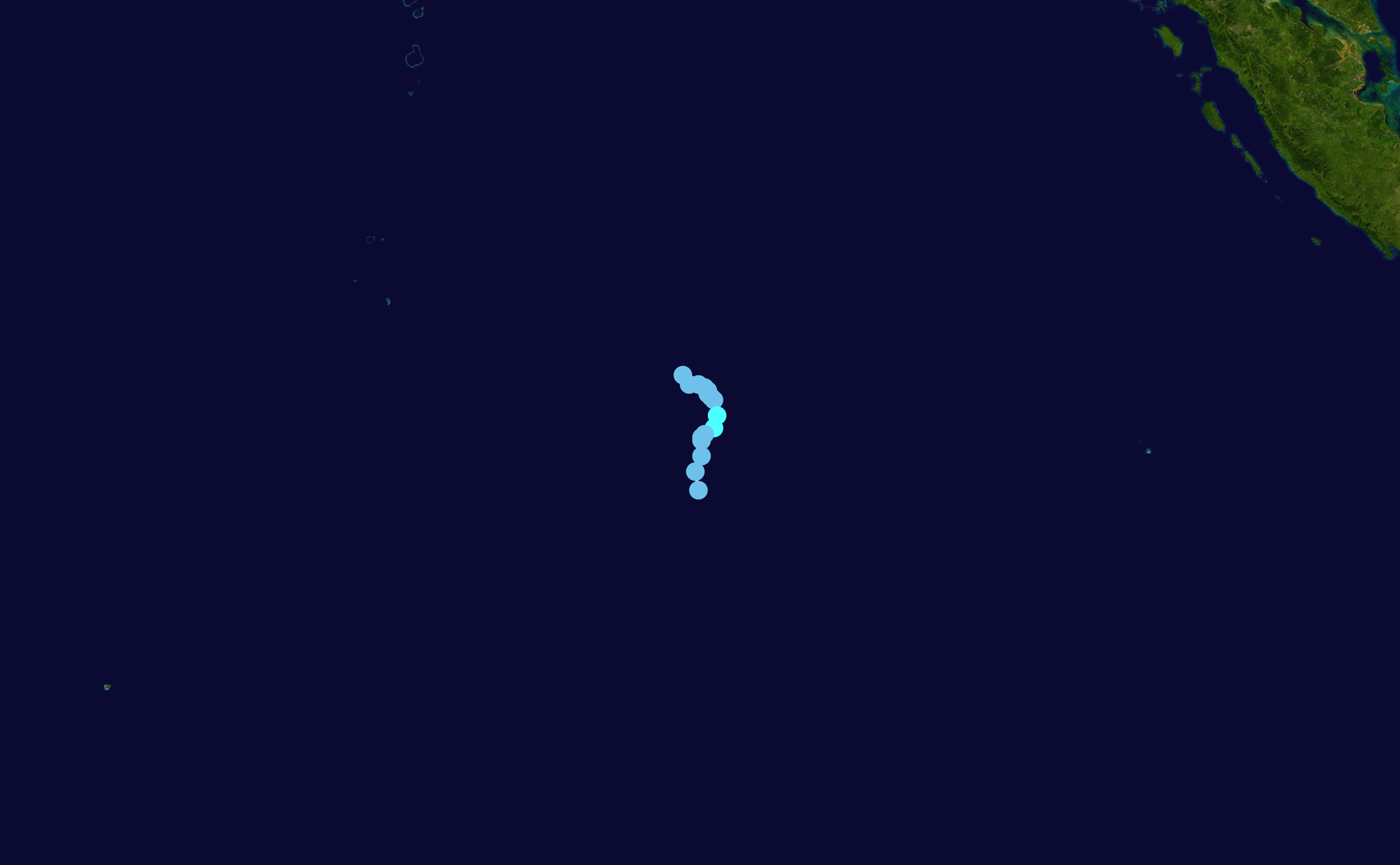
- Duration: October 3 – October 7
- Peak intensity: 55 km/h (35 mph) (10-min); 998 hPa (mbar)

The first storm of the season originated from an area of convection east of Diego Garcia in early October 2001. Moving southwestward, it slowly organized, with convection developing around a weak circulation. Late on October 3, MFR classified the system as a zone of disturbed weather. On October 5, the agency re-classified it as a tropical disturbance and later as Tropical Depression 1. The circulation was partially exposed due to wind shear, although it had good outflow. The JTWC initiated advisories on Tropical Cyclone 01S at 0600 UTC on October 6, estimating winds of about 65 km/h (40 mph). Due to the shear, the convection gradually diminished, prompting the MFR to downgrade it to a tropical disturbance on October 7. The next day, the JTWC issued its last advisory, noting that the system was dissipating.

=== Severe Tropical Storm Alex–Andre ===
- Severe tropical storm (MFR)
- Tropical storm (SSHWS)
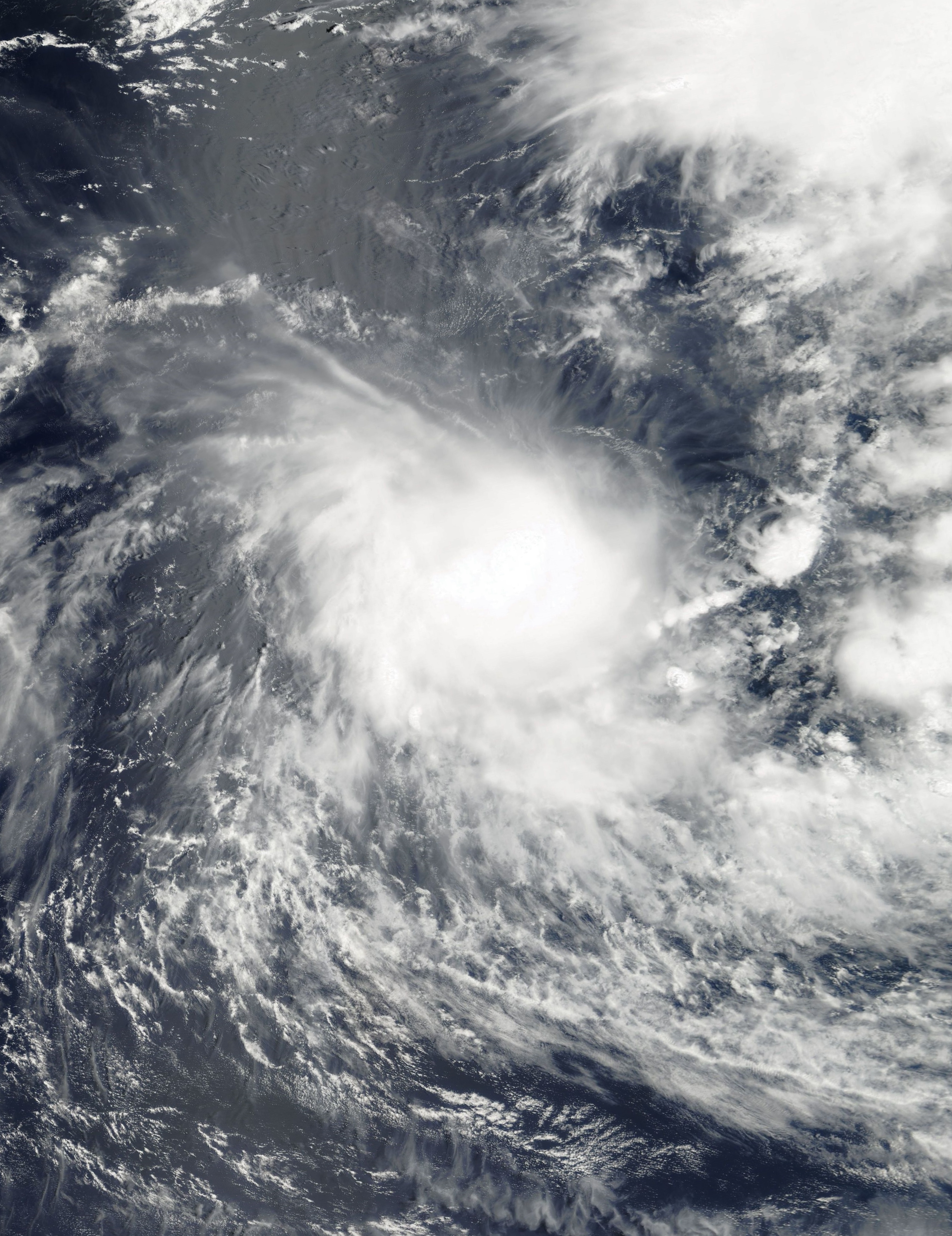
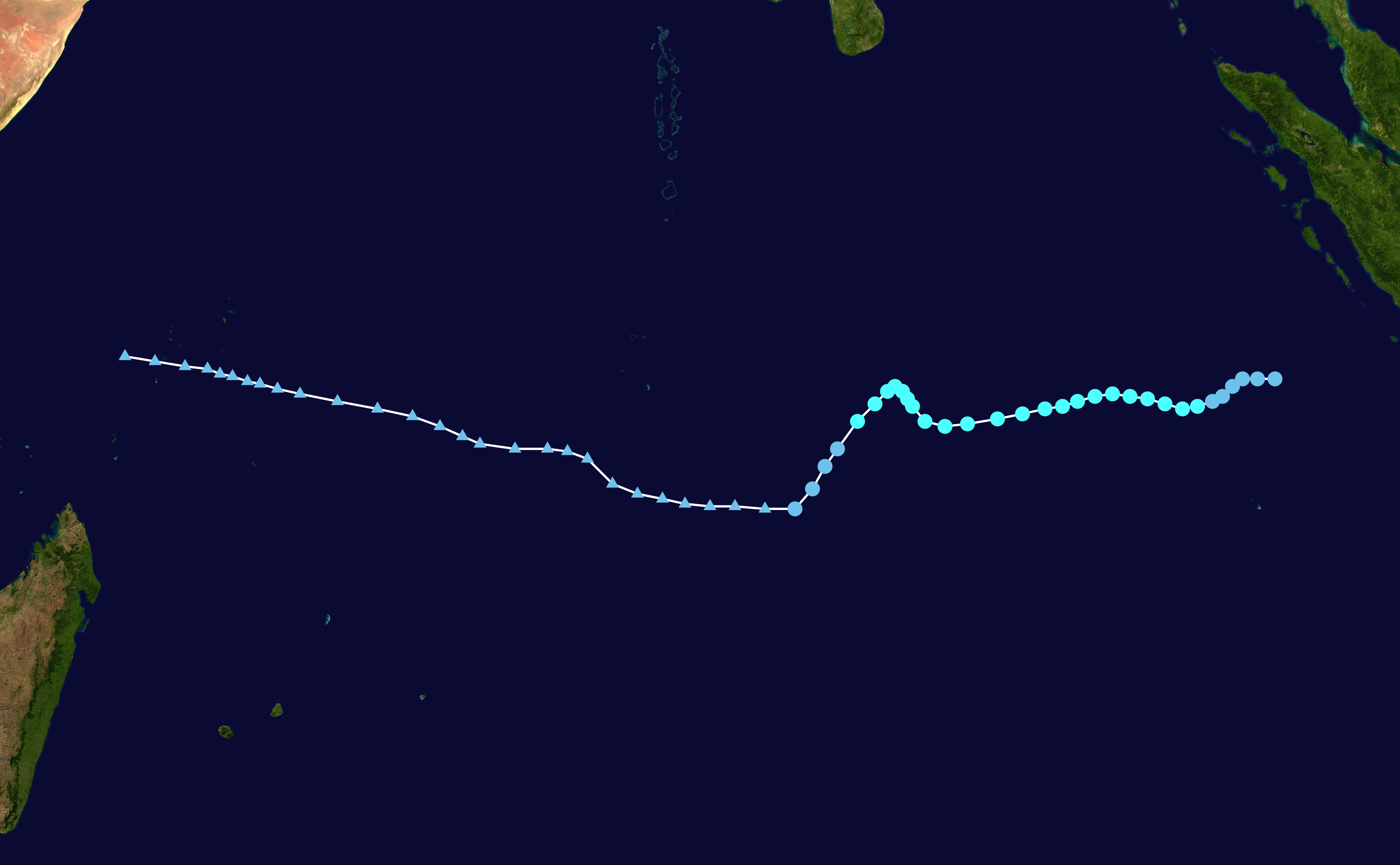
- Duration: October 28 (Entered basin) – November 8
- Peak intensity: 95 km/h (60 mph) (10-min); 985 hPa (mbar)

The Bureau of Meteorology (BoM) classified a tropical low as Tropical Cyclone Alex on October 26 in the Australian region. It was initially located in an area of strong wind shear, which prevented significant strengthening. However, convection over the system increased on October 27, and it crossed into the South-West Indian Ocean at around the same time. It was renamed Andre, becoming the earliest date for the first named storm since 1992. After reaching 10‑minute sustained winds of 100 km/h (62 mph), according to the MFR, Andre began slowly weakening, due to increasing shear. It moved generally to the west-southwest before turning northwestward on October 29, around which time the convection separated from the center. Moving slowly, Andre later turned to the southwest after weakening to a tropical depression. Late on October 31, the system was no longer classifiable as a tropical system, and the remnants continued to the west-southwest until being absorbed by a trough on November 8.

=== Tropical Depression 03 ===
- Tropical depression (MFR)
- Tropical storm (SSHWS)
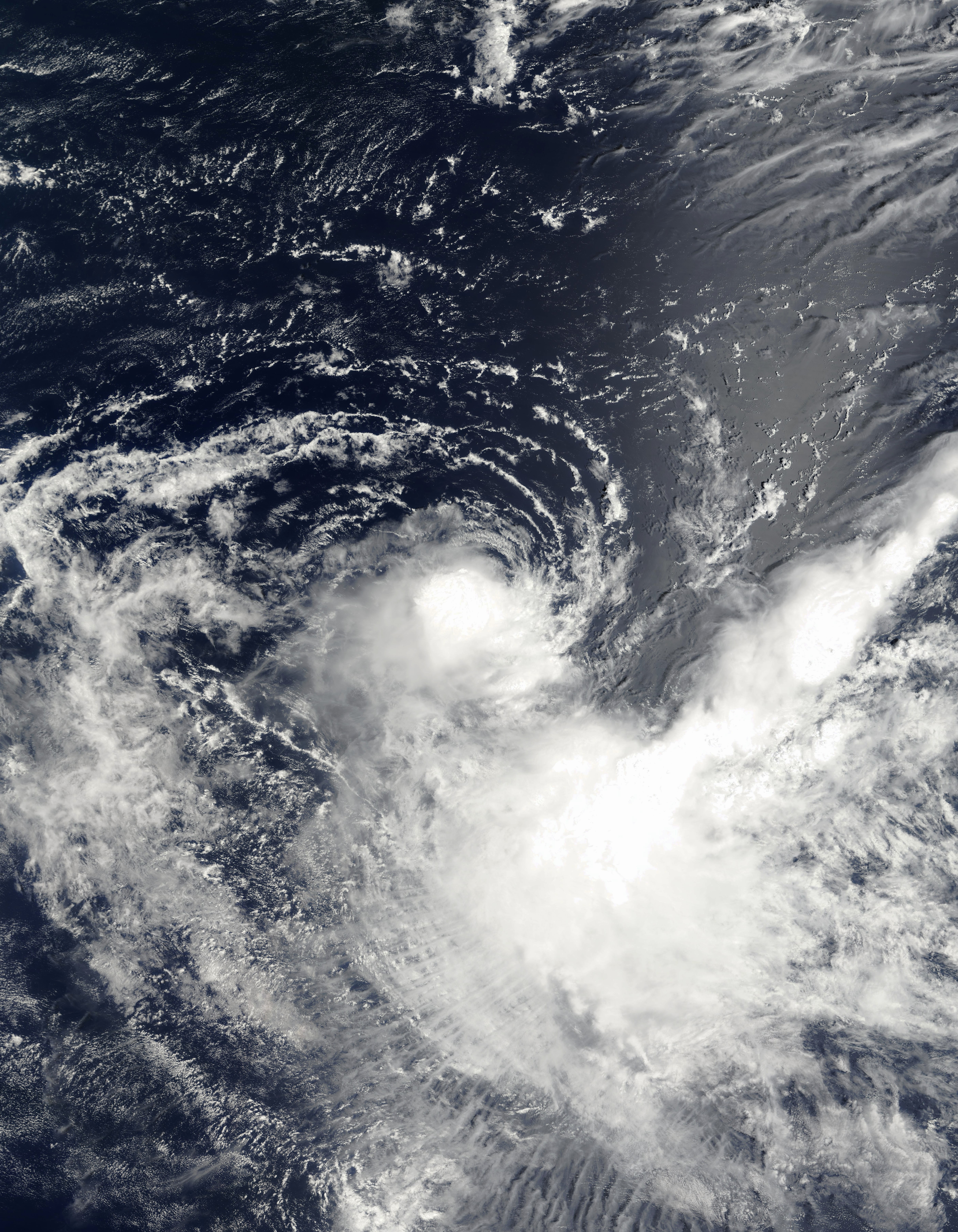
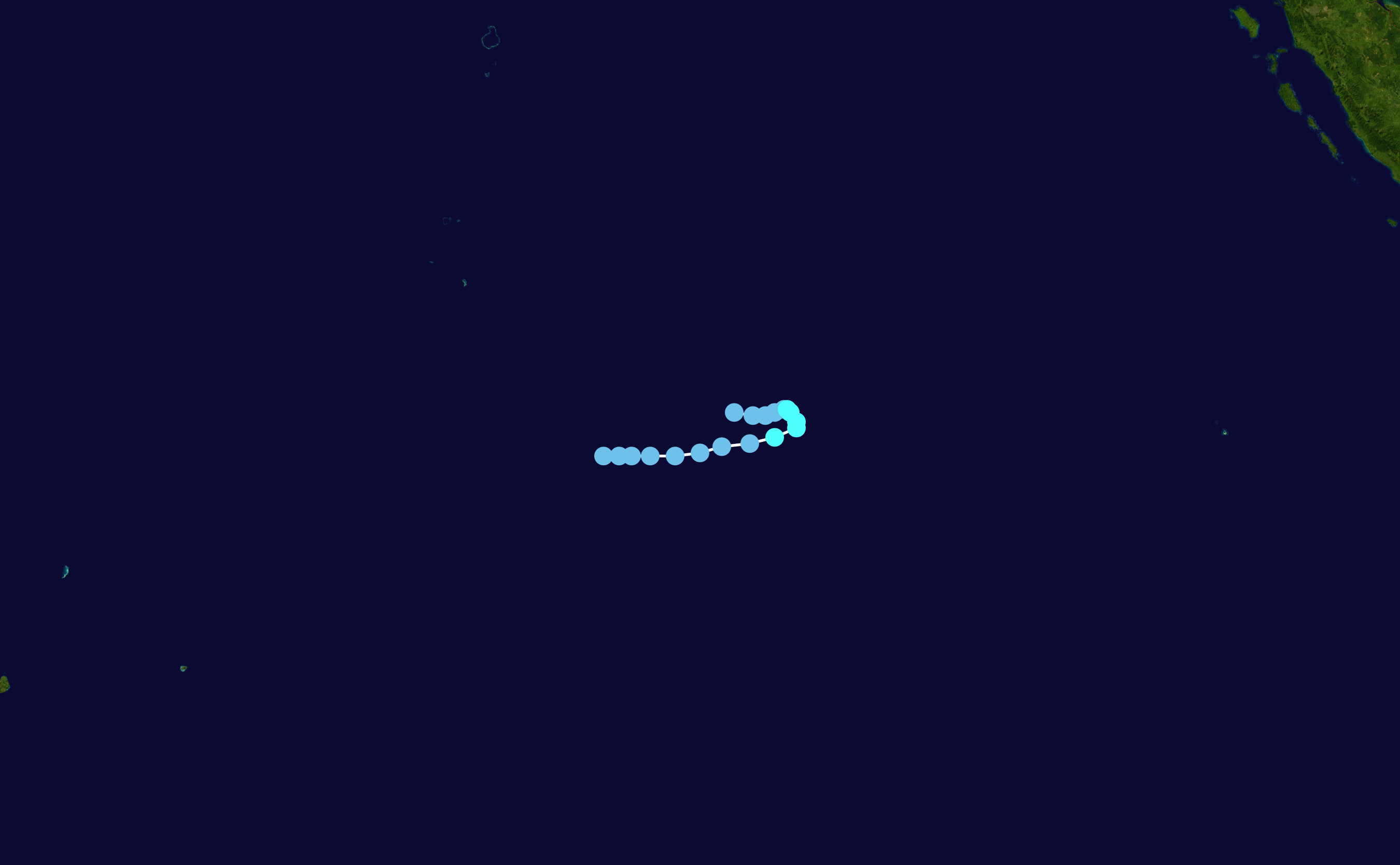
- Duration: November 15 – November 23
- Peak intensity: 55 km/h (35 mph) (10-min); 998 hPa (mbar)

A zone of disturbed weather formed on November 15 in the eastern part of the basin. It remained a zone of disturbed weather for a few days before briefly strengthening into a tropical depression on November 21. It dissipated two days later. This system was also designated as tropical cyclone by the JTWC.

=== Tropical Cyclone Bessi–Bako ===
- Tropical cyclone (MFR)
- Category 1 tropical cyclone (SSHWS)
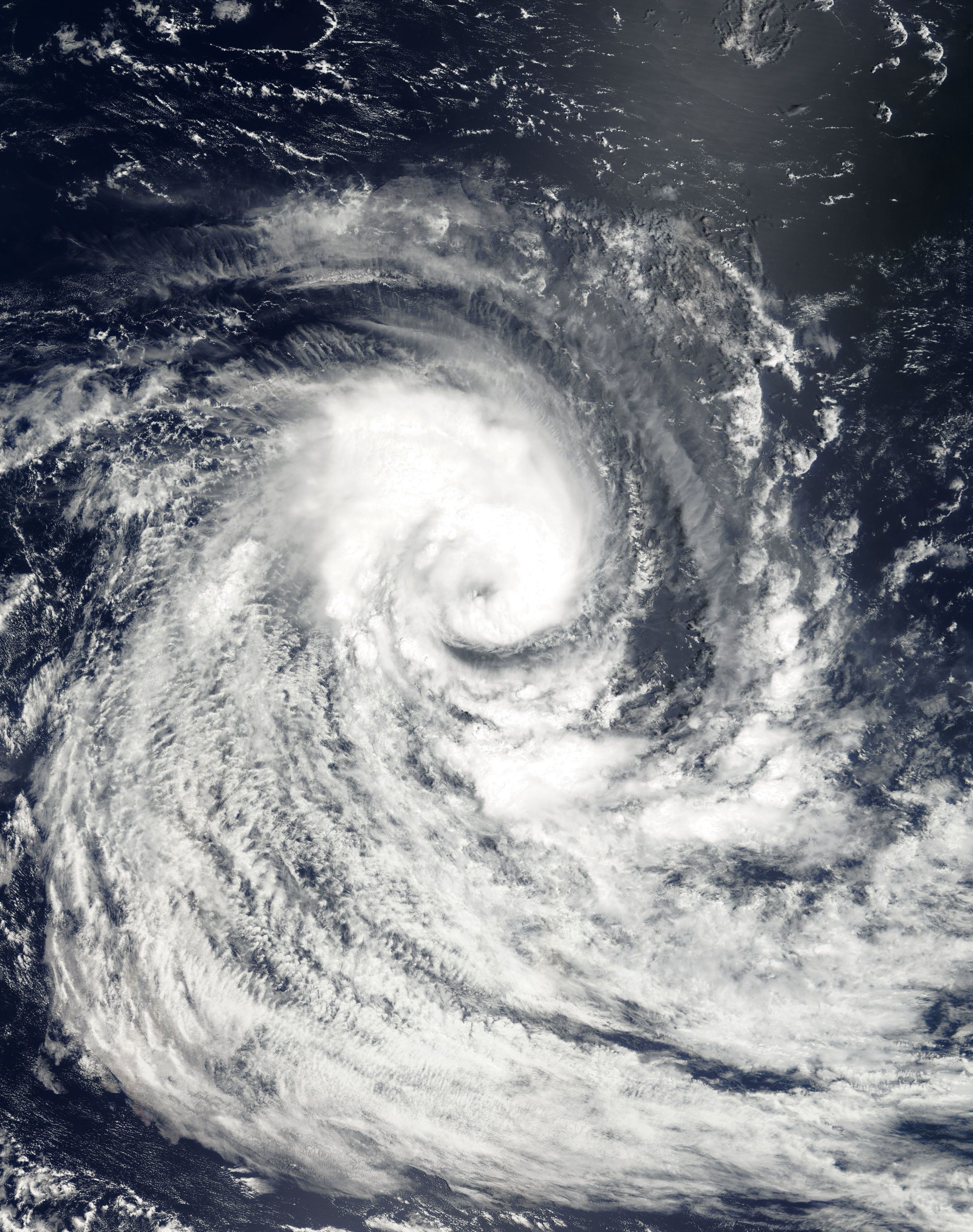
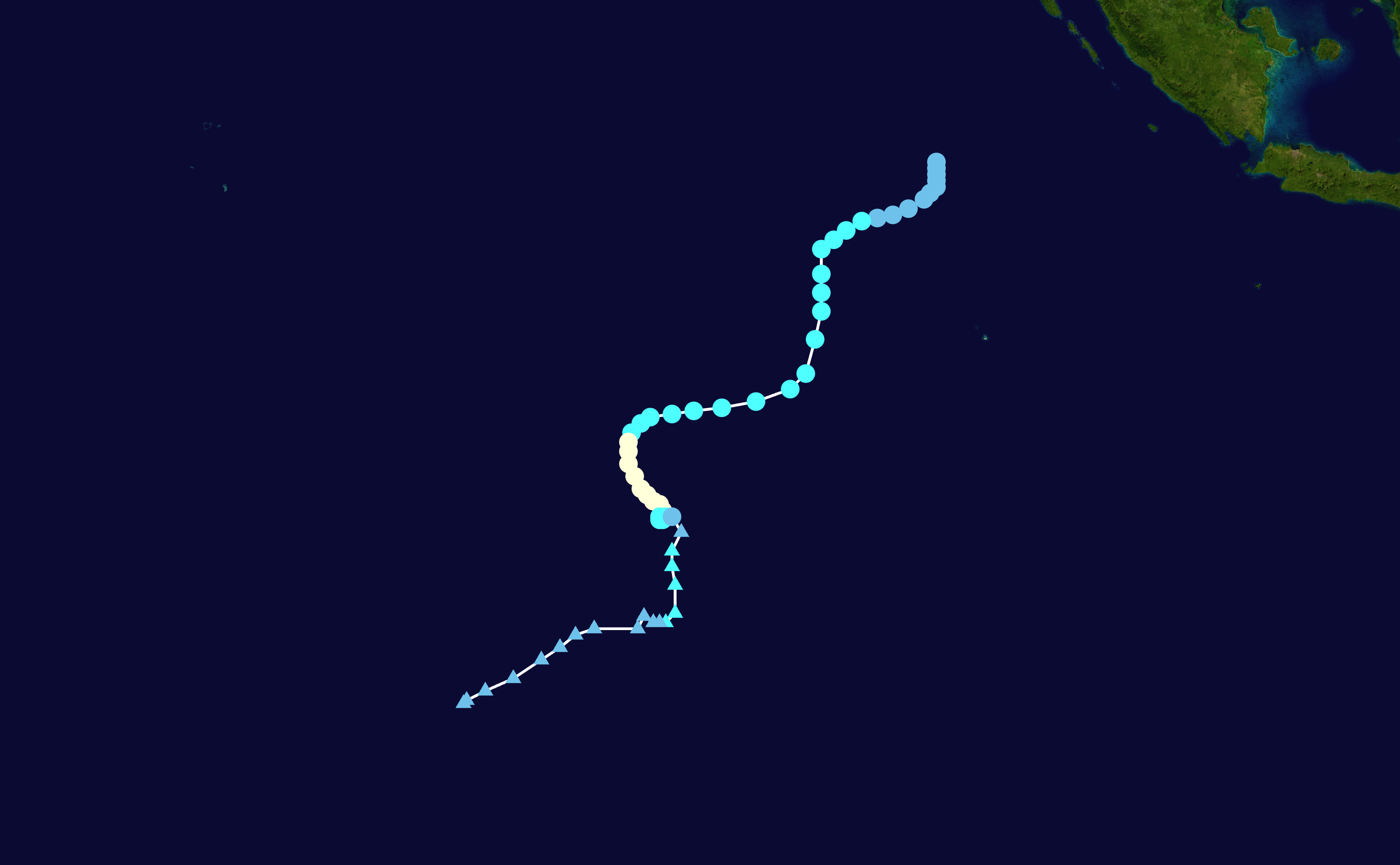
- Duration: November 30 (Entered basin) – December 5
- Peak intensity: 120 km/h (75 mph) (10-min); 968 hPa (mbar)

The monsoon trough spawned a tropical low on November 24 in the Australian basin. It moved to the southwest, strengthening into Tropical Cyclone Bessi on November 27. Two days later, it moved into the South-West Indian Ocean, and was renamed Bako on December 1. Located in a similar position to the previous storm, Bako strengthened into a severe tropical storm on December 1, aided by warm waters and slack wind shear. The storm turned to the southeast on December 2, despite predictions to the contrary, and later that day it intensified further into a tropical cyclone, the first of the season. However, on December 3, Bako weakened back into a severe tropical storm due to much cooler sea surface temperatures and increasing northwesterly wind shear. It weakened into a tropical depression on December 5, before transitioning into an extratropical cyclone the same day. RSMC La Reunion continued to track the remnants of Bako until December 9.

=== Severe Tropical Storm Cyprien ===
- Severe tropical storm (MFR)
- Tropical storm (SSHWS)
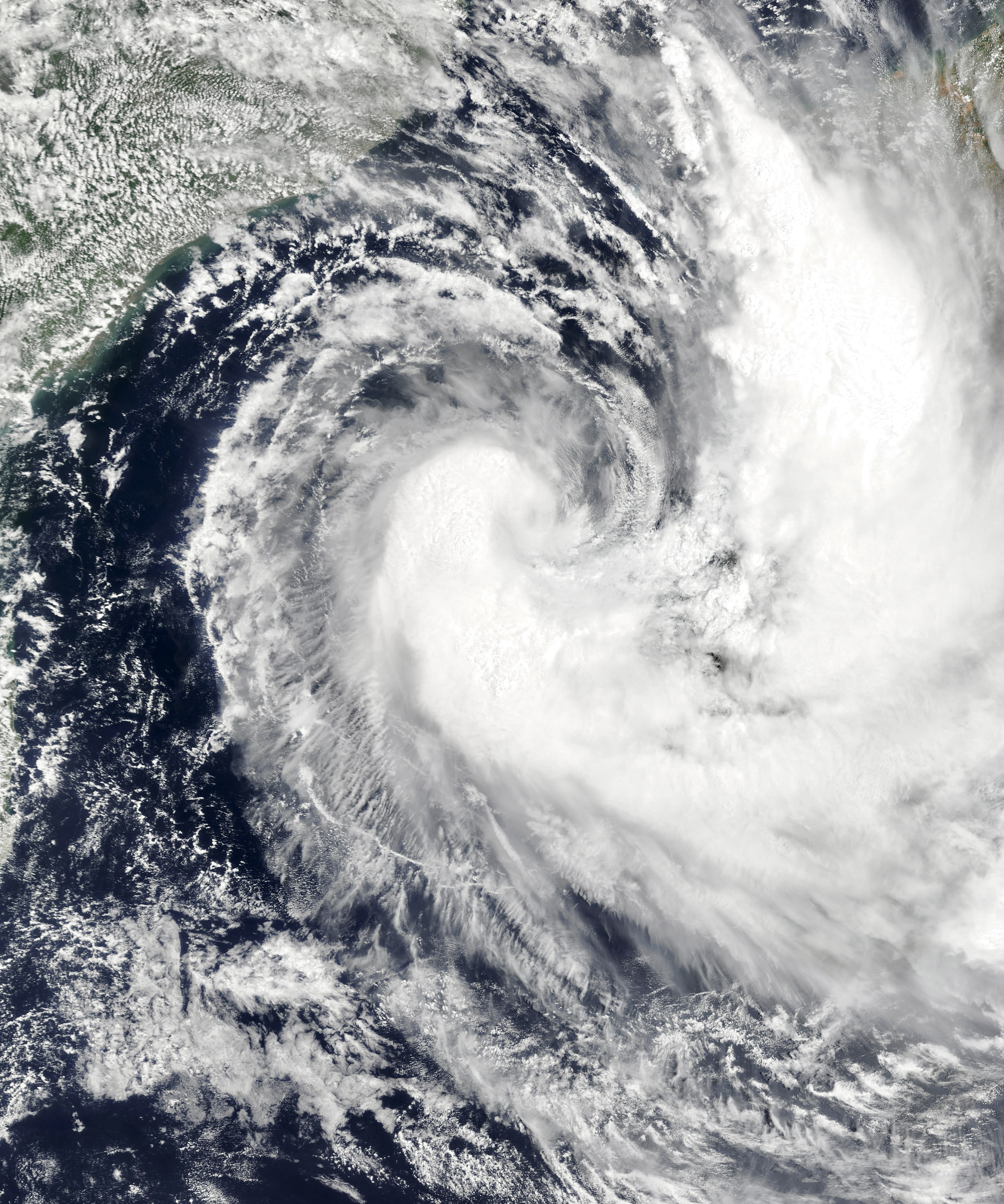
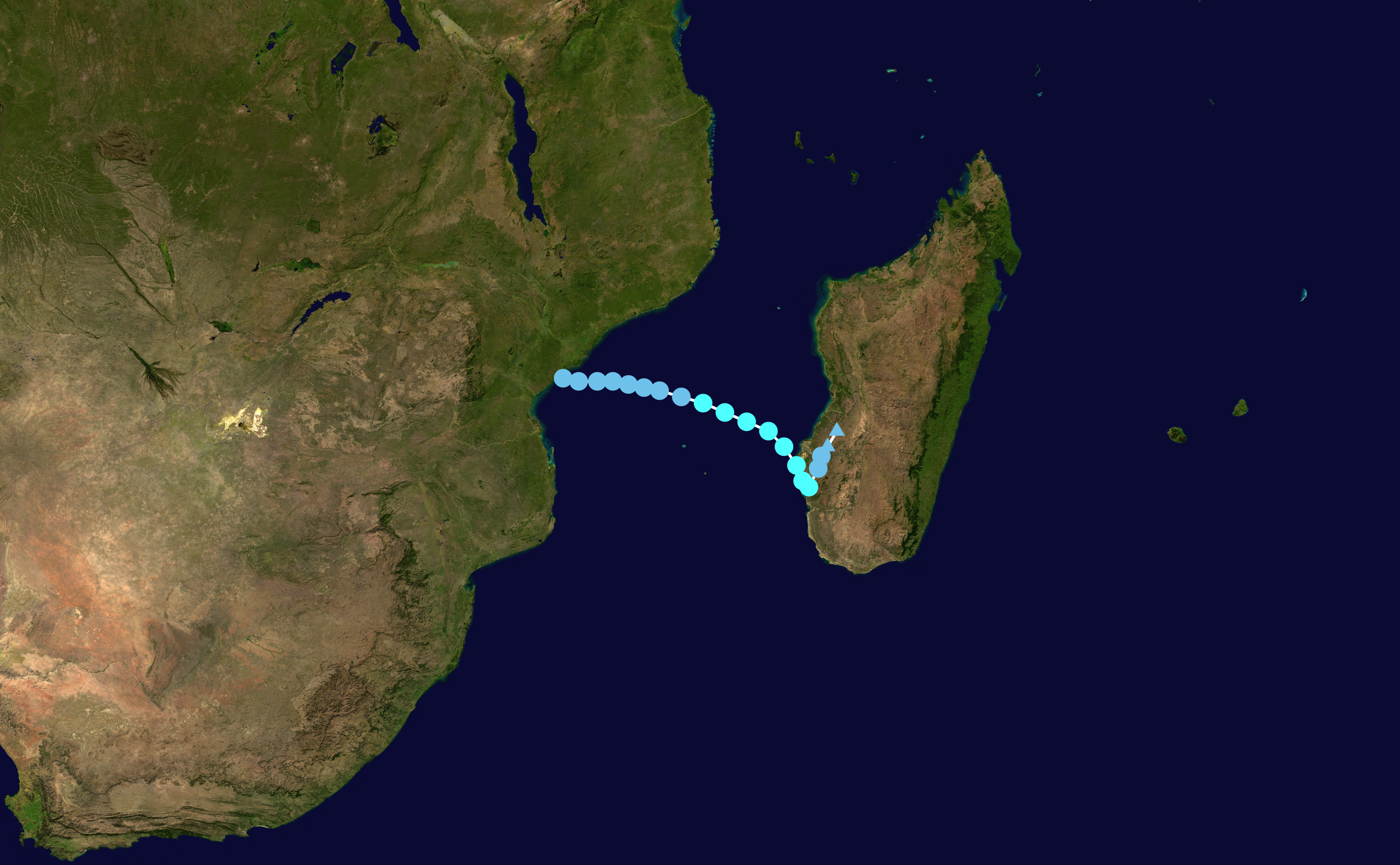
- Duration: December 30 – January 3
- Peak intensity: 100 km/h (65 mph) (10-min); 980 hPa (mbar)

On December 25, a cold front dragged over the central Mozambique Channel. A weak circulation formed in the Channel and moderate convection appeared on December 27. Then on December 30, RSMC La Reunion designated this low pressure as a zone of disturbed weather and was classified as a tropical depression on January 1, 2002. The JTWC also issued a Tropical Cyclone Formation Alert (TCFA) early on December 31 and designated it as Tropical Cyclone 08S the next day. As it moved further eastwards it strengthened quickly from a tropical depression into a severe tropical storm, with the Meteorological Services of Madagascar giving it the name Cyprien on January 1. Cyprien soon became a serious threat to western Madagascar. Convection began to dissipate as wind shear increased and that resulted in quick weakening to a tropical depression. As it made landfall on western Madagascar, it dropped heavy rainfall. In all, Cyprien destroyed 841 homes in the towns of Morombe and Morondava. Damage in the towns was estimated at $180,000, but there were no deaths.

=== Intense Tropical Cyclone Dina ===
- Intense tropical cyclone (MFR)
- Category 4 tropical cyclone (SSHWS)
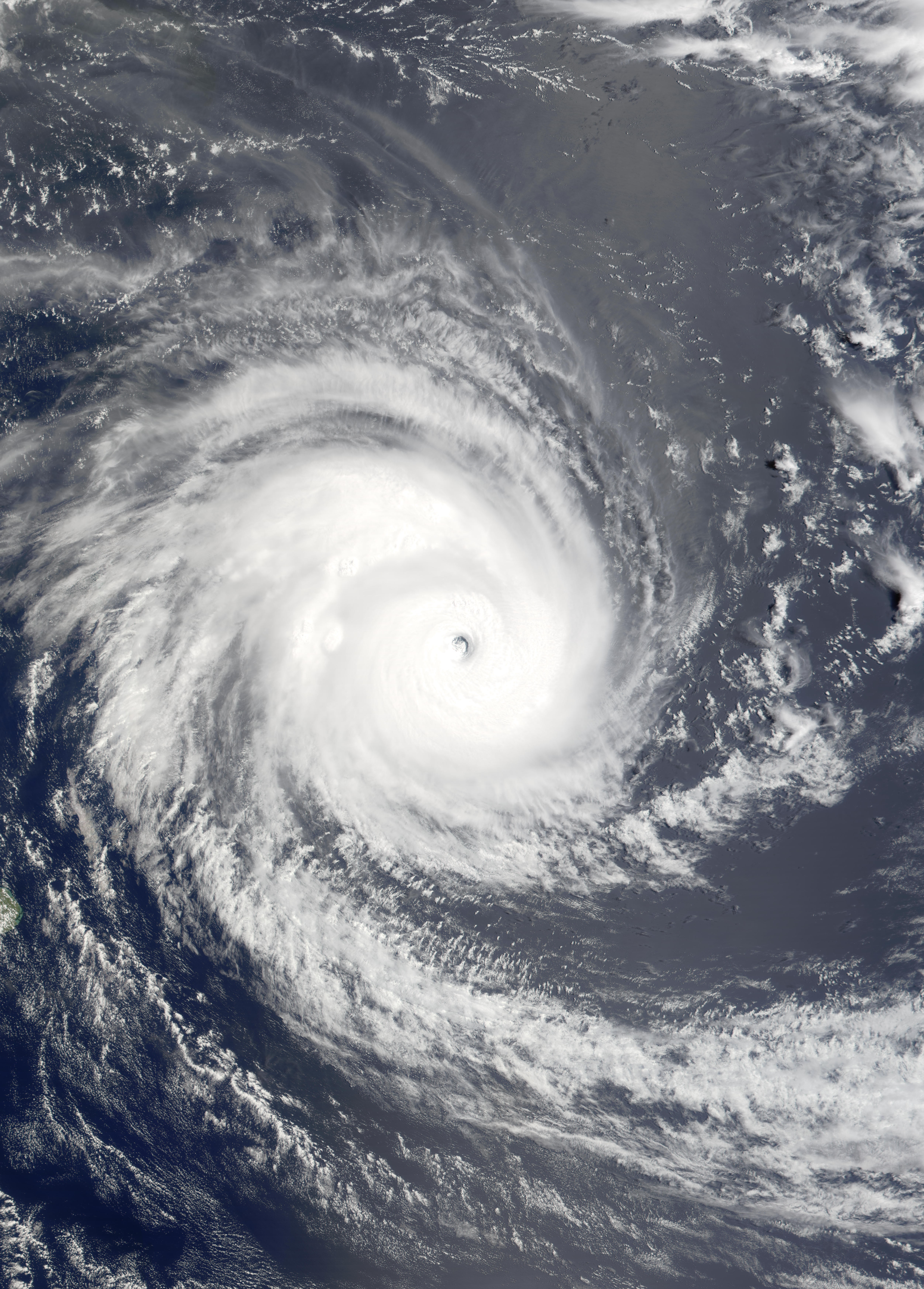
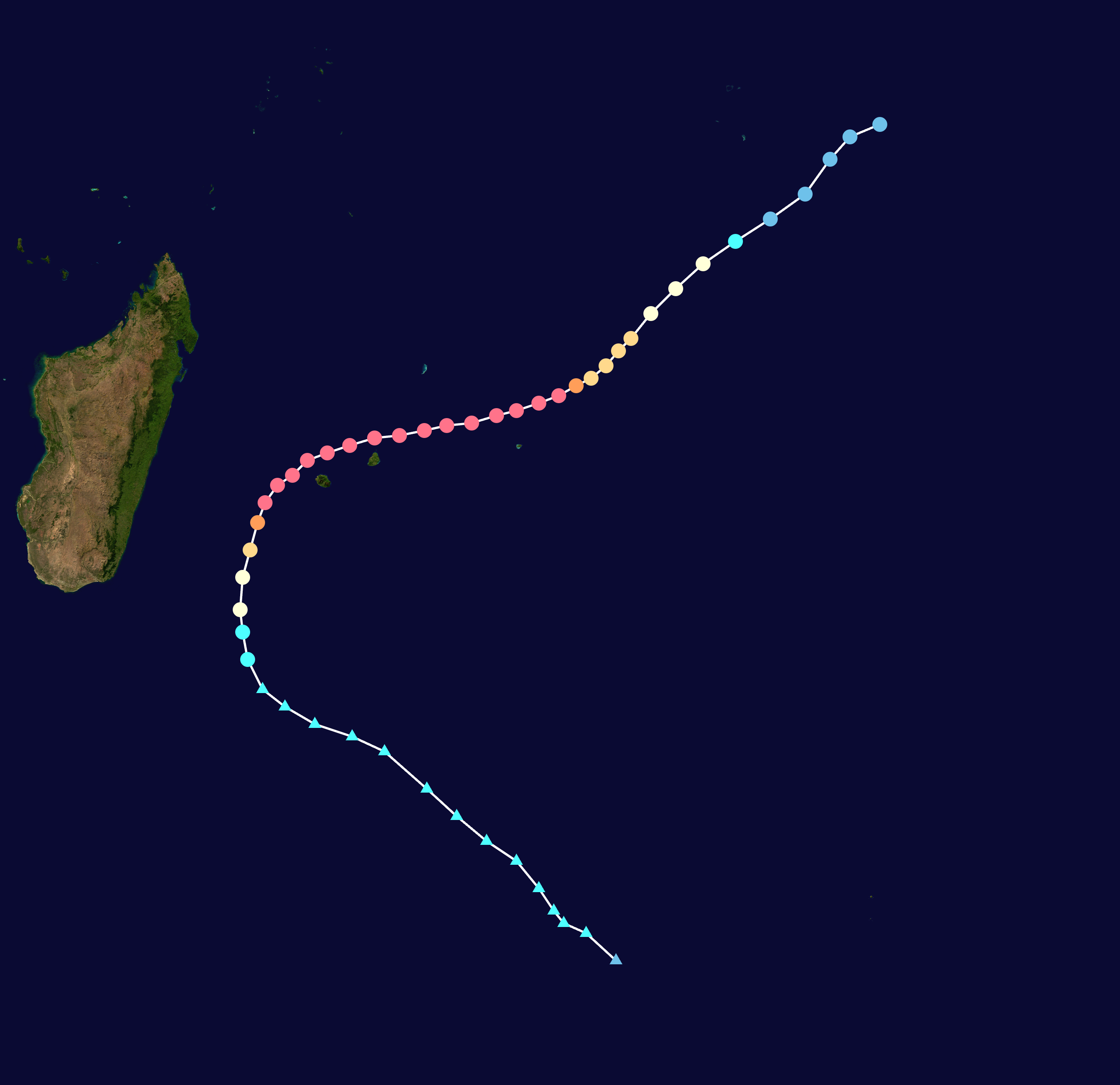
- Duration: January 16 – January 25
- Peak intensity: 215 km/h (130 mph) (10-min); 910 hPa (mbar)

Cyclone Dina originated in a tropical disturbance first noted on January 15 near the Chagos Archipelago. By January 17, the system had developed enough organized convection as it moved southwestward to be declared a tropical depression. Rapid intensification occurred shortly thereafter, with the system attaining winds in excess of 120 km/h (75 mph) on January 18. Dina peaked in intensity on January 20 as an intense tropical cyclone with winds of 210 km/h (130 mph). Hours later, the storm bypassed Rodrigues Island about 150 km (93 mi) to its north. On January 21, the storm brushed Mauritius and Réunion as an intense tropical cyclone before turning southward. Once on a southward course, steady weakening ensued and the system eventually transitioned into an extratropical cyclone on January 25. The remnants of the storm accelerated southeastward and were absorbed into a polar trough on January 28.

Across Mauritius and Réunion, torrential rains and destructive winds from the cyclone resulted in extensive to "catastrophic" damage. The entire island of Mauritius lost power during the storm and widespread structural damage took place. Agricultural and property damage amounted to US$47 million and US$50 million respectively in the republic. Nine fatalities were attributed to the storm in Mauritius: five off the coast of Rodrigues Island and four on the main island. More extensive damage was seen on Réunion where up to 2,102 mm (82.8 in) of rain fell over three days. Flooding destroyed many homes, washed out roads, and caused catastrophic agricultural damage. Destructive winds, measured at up to 280 km/h (170 mph), also crippled communications. In all, six people died on the island and losses were estimated at €200 million (US$190 million).

=== Tropical Cyclone Eddy ===
- Tropical cyclone (MFR)
- Category 1 tropical cyclone (SSHWS)
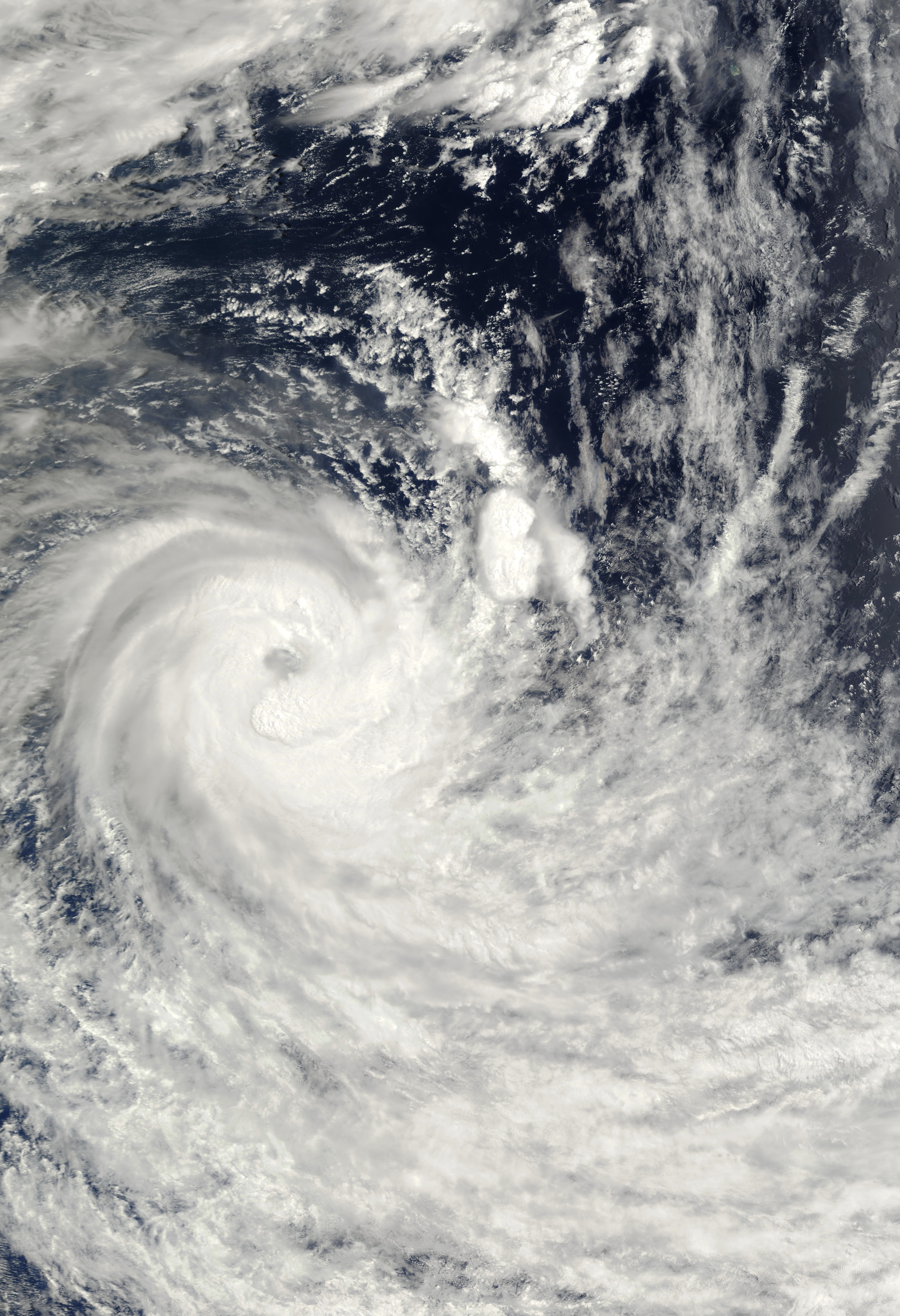
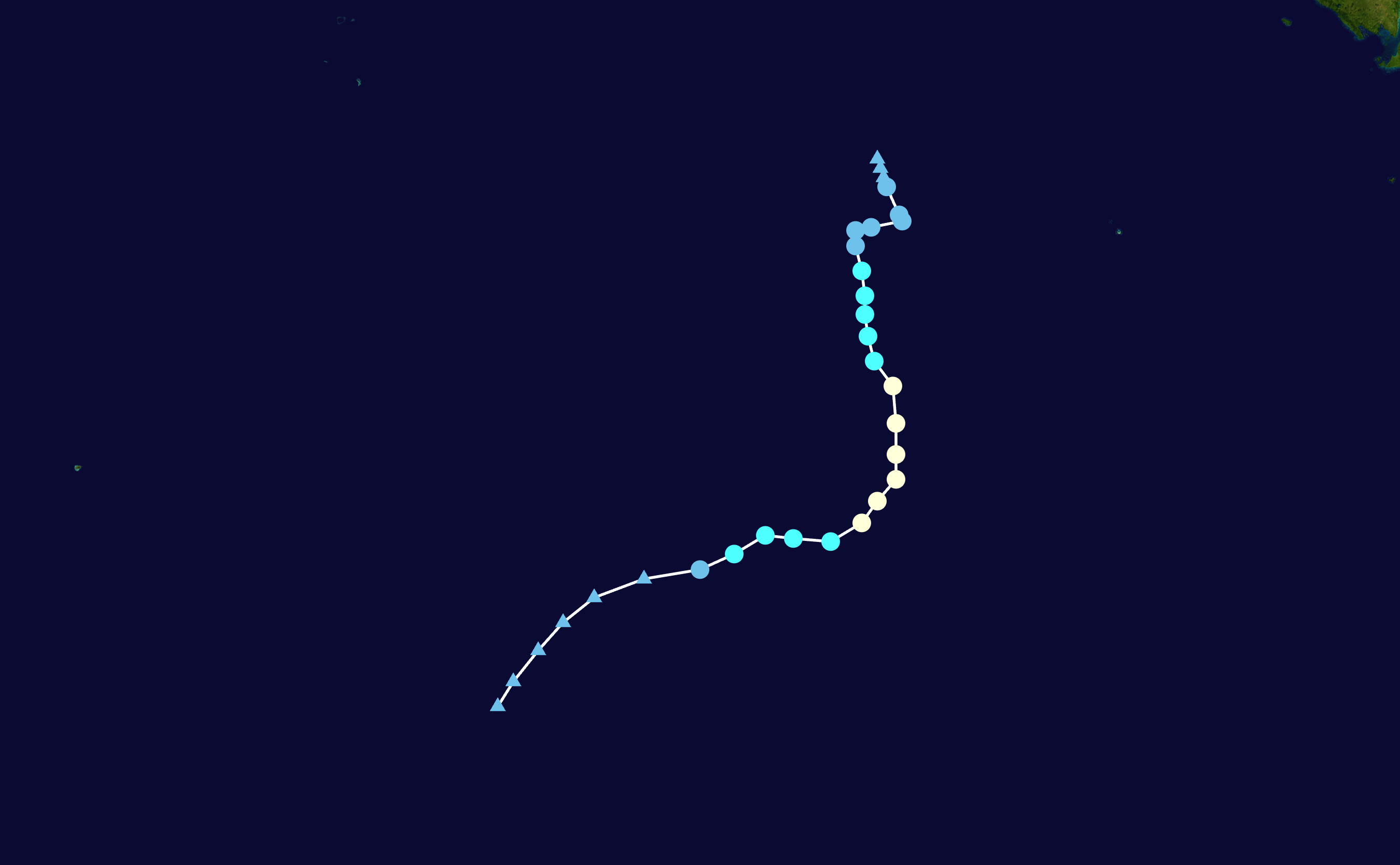
- Duration: January 22 – January 30
- Peak intensity: 130 km/h (80 mph) (10-min); 965 hPa (mbar)

A system developed within a convergence zone on January 20 near the boundary between the South-West Indian Ocean and the Australia region. Its circulation became better defined, and MFR initiated advisories on January 22. With a ridge to the south, it drifted to the southeast, approaching 90°E, but turning to the southwest before crossing over. On January 23, the system intensified into a tropical depression. Slowly intensifying, the depression became Tropical Storm Eddy on January 24. That day, the JTWC initiated advisories on Tropical Cyclone 11S, and it turned toward the south. After having experienced moderate wind shear, Eddy entered an area of more favorable conditions, and its convection gradually organized. Early on January 26, MFR upgraded it to a tropical cyclone, later estimating peak winds of 130 km/h (81 mph). After that time, increasing wind shear weakened Eddy to a tropical storm, causing it to curve to the west. By January 28, the circulation was exposed from the convection, and Eddy weakened to a tropical depression. It turned to the southwest the next day, and dissipated fully on January 30.

=== Intense Tropical Cyclone Francesca ===
- Intense tropical cyclone (MFR)
- Category 4 tropical cyclone (SSHWS)
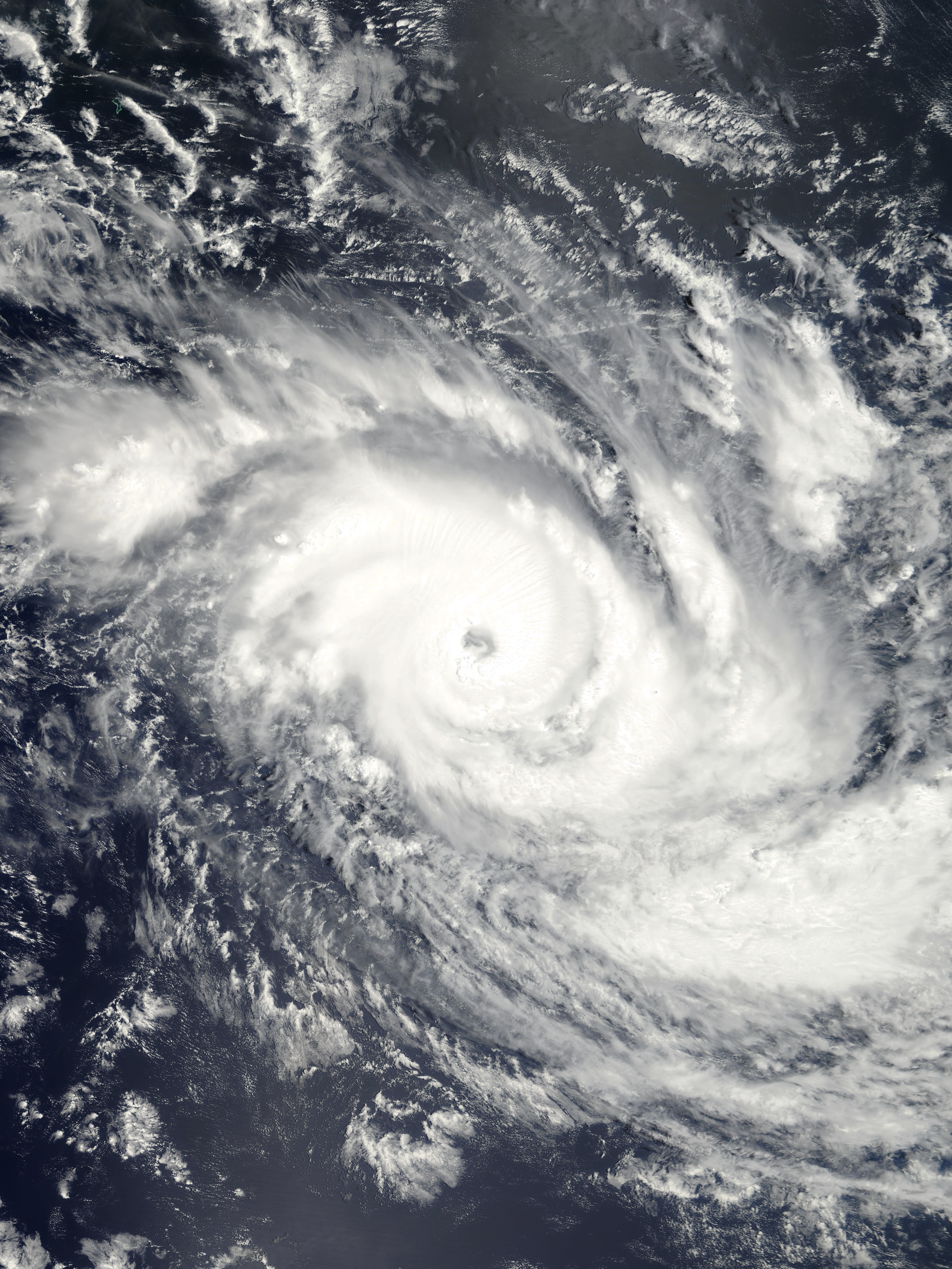
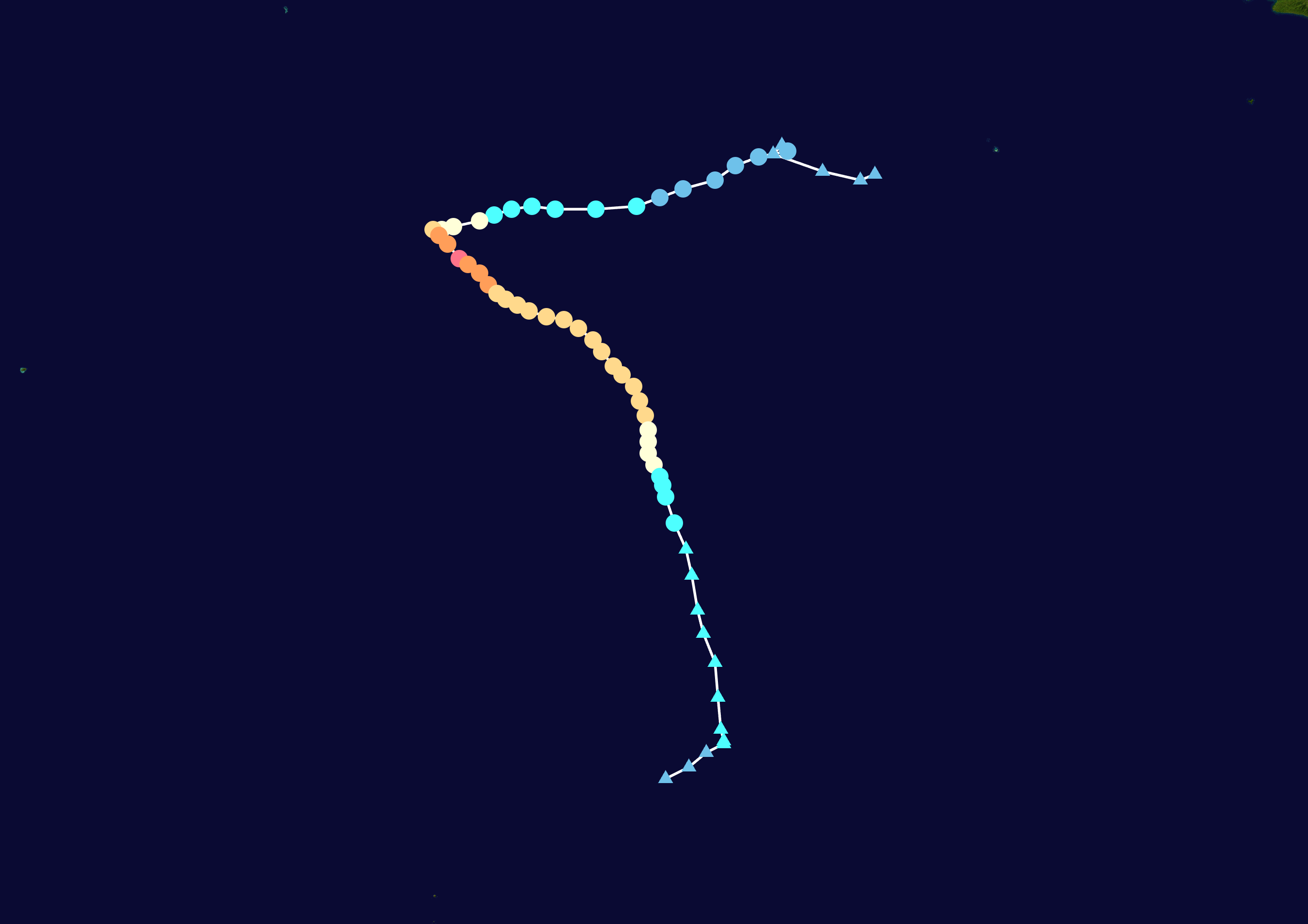
- Duration: January 30 – February 11
- Peak intensity: 195 km/h (120 mph) (10-min); 925 hPa (mbar)

The origins of Francesca were from a tropical low that formed in the Australia region on January 28, east of the Cocos Islands. This was near the same place that Eddy had formed a week prior. The system that became Francesca moved west-southwestward due to a ridge to the south. On January 30 it crossed into the South-West Indian Ocean, where wind shear prevented significant development. On January 31, the system intensified into a tropical depression, and late the next day the JTWC classified it as Tropical Cyclone 12S. Wind shear diminished on February 2, which allowed the depression to strengthen into Tropical Storm Francesca after convection increased. It continued to intensify steadily, becoming a tropical cyclone on February 3. The next day, the JTWC upgraded Francesca to the equivalent of a minimal hurricane.

An approaching trough turned the cyclone to the southeast, and Francesca quickly developed a well-defined eye. It rapidly strengthened into an intense tropical cyclone, and reached peak winds of 185 km/h (115 mph) on February 4, according to MFR. The JTWC estimated peak 1‑minute winds of 215 km/h (134 mph) when the storm was located about 1,065 km (662 mi) southeast of Diego Garcia. Shortly after peaking, Francesca began weakening, losing its eye, until being a minimal tropical cyclone on February 7. That day, it re-intensified slightly and redeveloped an eye, although it was short-lived. Increasing shear again weakened Francesca, and on February 9 the cyclone deteriorated to a tropical storm. Cooler waters caused further weakening, which diminished convection over the center. On February 11, Francesca became extratropical, and the remnants turned to the southwest, dissipating on February 14.

=== Intense Tropical Cyclone Guillaume ===
- Intense tropical cyclone (MFR)
- Category 4 tropical cyclone (SSHWS)
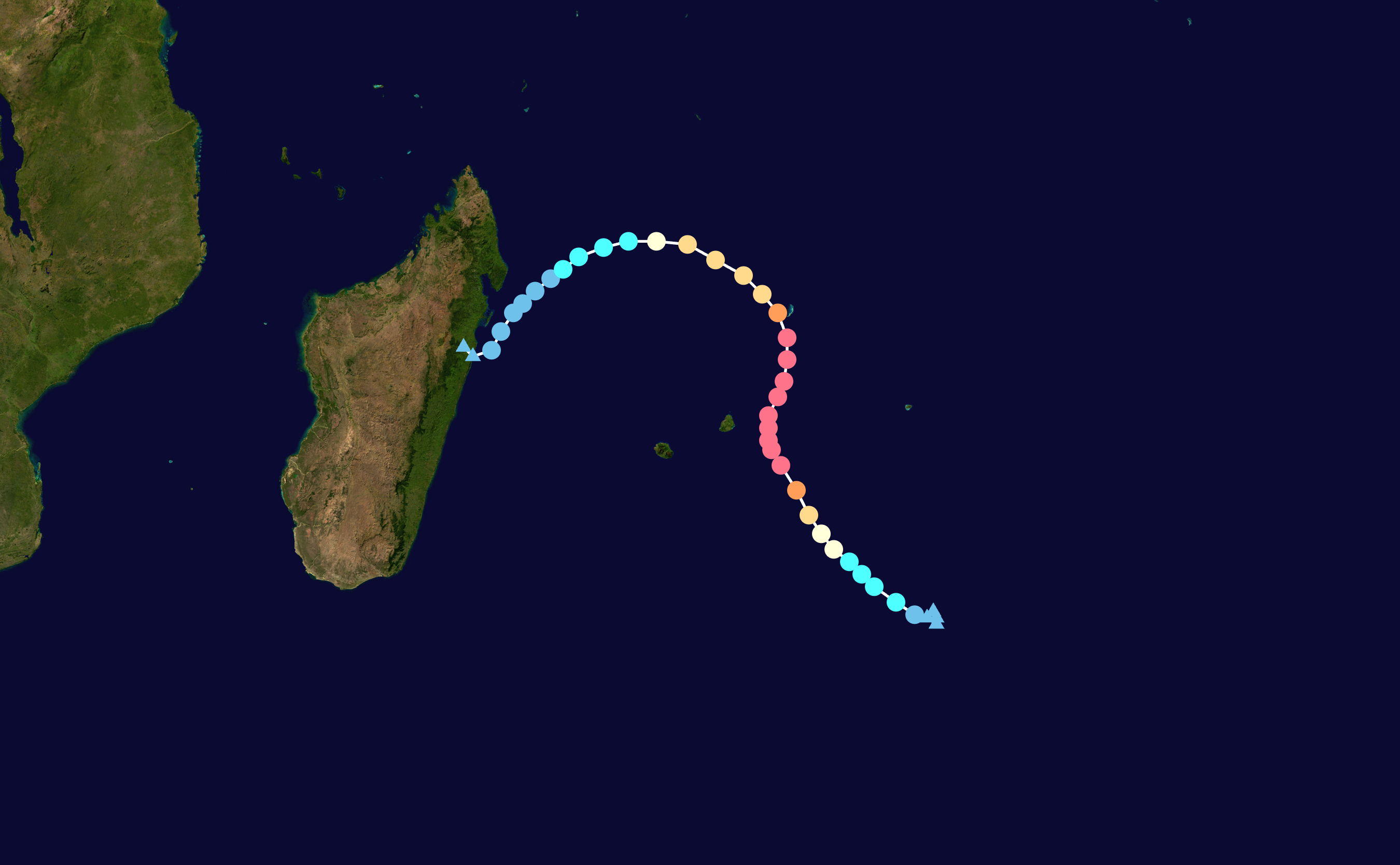
- Duration: February 14 – February 23
- Peak intensity: 205 km/h (125 mph) (10-min); 920 hPa (mbar)

On February 13, several low-pressure areas were located over east-central Madagascar, with an area of convection that extended northwestward across the country toward Comoros. The system dropped heavy rainfall, reaching 250 mm (9.8 in) in Tamatave in a 12‑hour period. In Mamoudzou, the capital of Mayotte, rainfall reached 195 mm (7.7 in) in 24 hours, which caused some damage on the island including a bridge collapse. A developing center gradually became better organized, and it took an unusual track offshore toward the northeast, steered by a ridge over Madagascar. On February 14, MFR classified the system as a zone of disturbed weather, upgrading it to a tropical disturbance the next day. Late on February 15, the JTWC initiated advisories on Tropical Cyclone 15S, and early the next day MFR upgraded it to Tropical Depression 10. Shortly thereafter, the Meteorological Services of Madagascar upgraded the system to Tropical Storm Guillame.

Late on February 16, Guillame began developing a small eye, turning to the east around the same time. With favorable conditions, including good outflow, the system quickly intensified into a compact tropical cyclone as it turned to the southeast. Strengthening briefly stopped on February 17, possible due to an eyewall replacement cycle, although it resumed the following day. Guillame curved to the south and southwest, reaching peak winds of 195 km/h (121 mph) late on February 18; this made it an intense tropical cyclone. The next day, the cyclone passed about 150 km (93 mi) east of Mauritius before an approaching trough turned it to the southeast. Despite the storm's proximity to the island, effects there were modest, marked by winds of 78 km/h (48 mph) and 71 mm (2.8 in) of rain. The cyclone began weakening due to increased wind shear, and deteriorated below tropical cyclone status on February 21. A strengthening ridge turned Guillame toward the northwest, and the storm dissipated on February 23.

=== Very Intense Tropical Cyclone Hary ===
- Very intense tropical cyclone (MFR)
- Category 5 tropical cyclone (SSHWS)
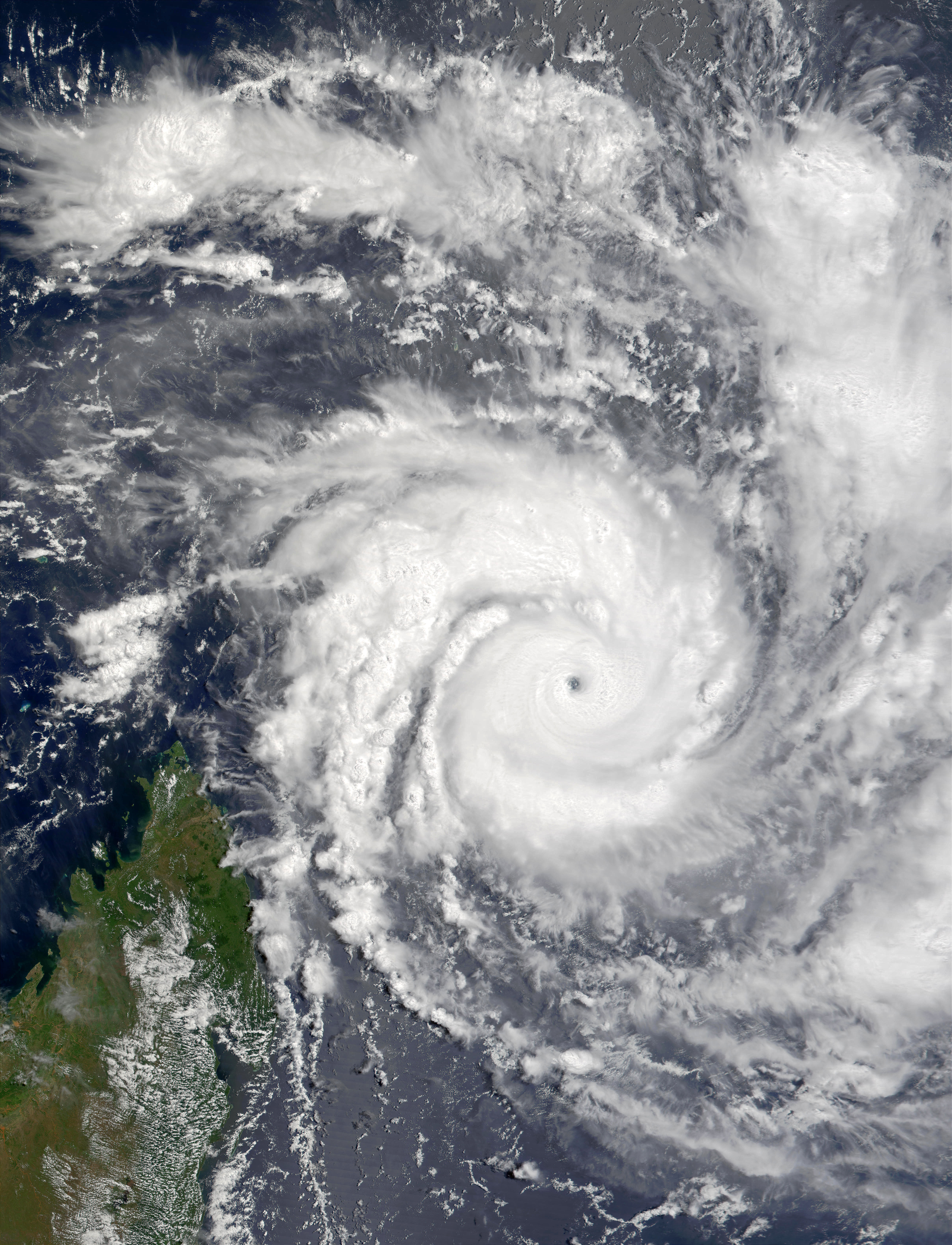
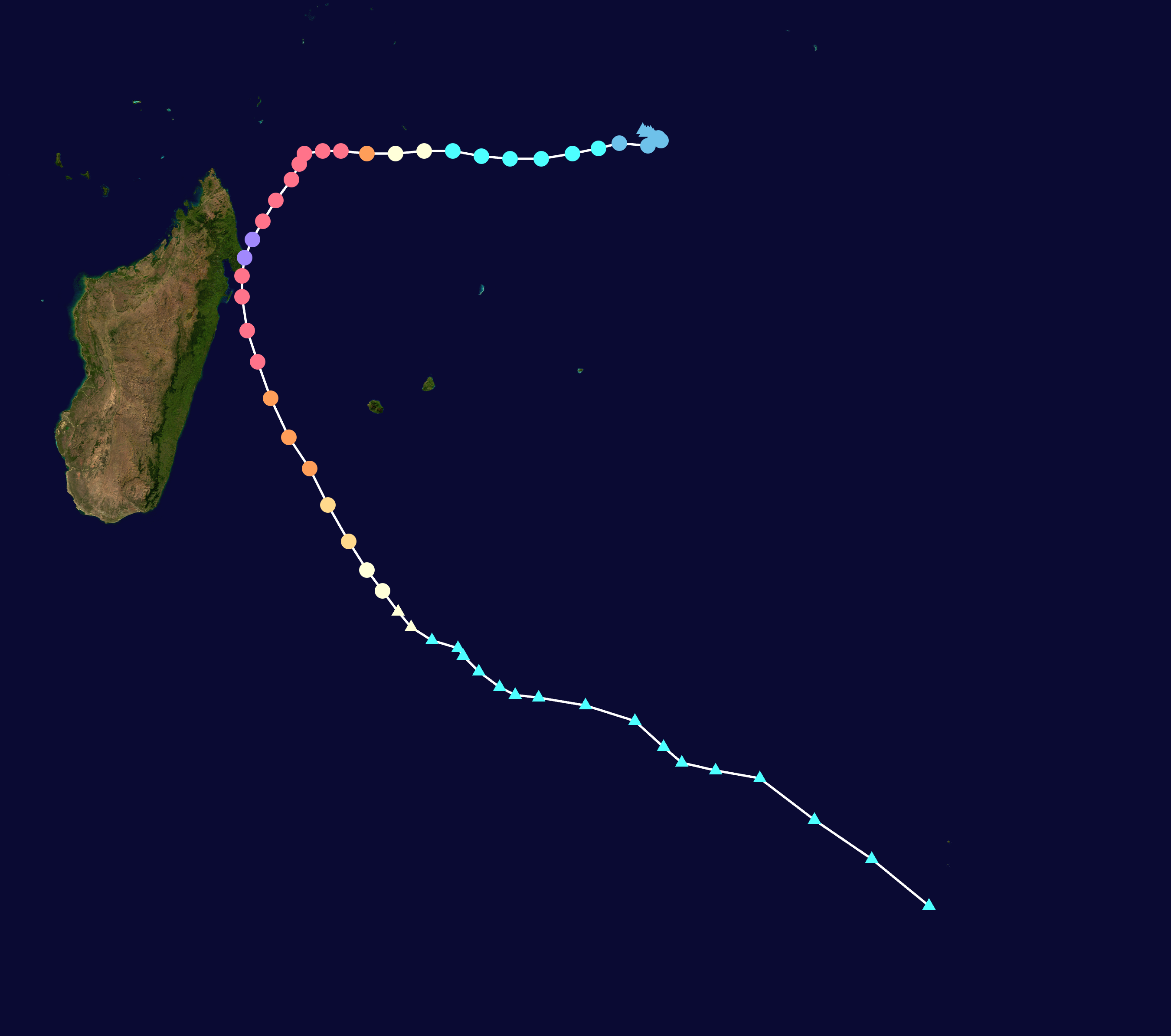
- Duration: March 3 – March 13
- Peak intensity: 220 km/h (140 mph) (10-min); 905 hPa (mbar)

Cyclone Hary was the strongest tropical cyclone of the season. Developing on March 5 from the monsoon trough, the storm initially moved generally to the west and gradually intensified. With favorable conditions, Hary quickly intensified on March 7, developing an eye and well-defined outflow. After reaching an initial peak, the cyclone briefly weakened due to an eyewall replacement cycle, by which time the storm turned southwestward toward Madagascar. Hary re-intensified and attained peak winds of 220 km/h (140 mph) on March 10 just offshore of eastern Madagascar, which made it the first very intense tropical cyclone since 2000.

After peaking, Hary weakened due to land interaction, and it struck Madagascar southeast of Antalaha. After turning south over land, Cyclone Hary quickly moved offshore. There were three deaths in the country, one of which was from electrocution. There was locally heavy crop damage, and four bridges were destroyed. However, the damage was considered minimal, given the intensity of the storm. After affecting Madagascar, Hary accelerated to the southeast, and the eastern periphery of the circulation moved over Réunion. On the mountain peaks of the island, rainfall reached 1,344 mm (52.9 in), although it was much less near the coast. The rainfall caused flooding, killing one person, and 20,000 people were left without power. Hary became extratropical on March 13, although its remnants continued for several days as a powerful mid-latitude storm.

=== Intense Tropical Cyclone Ikala ===
- Intense tropical cyclone (MFR)
- Category 3 tropical cyclone (SSHWS)
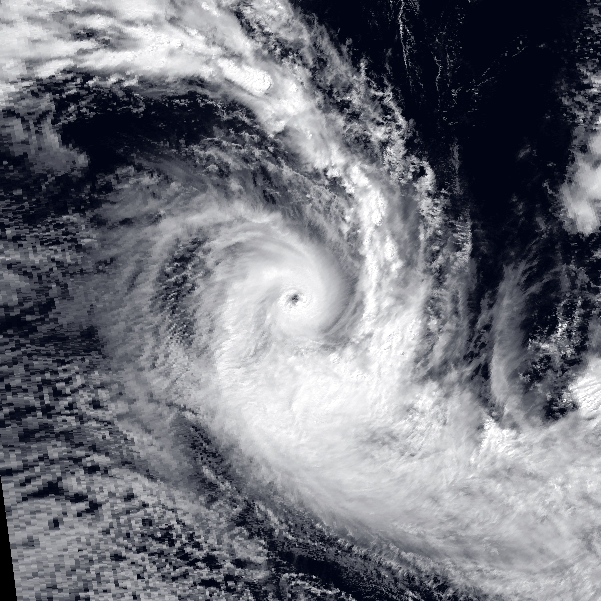
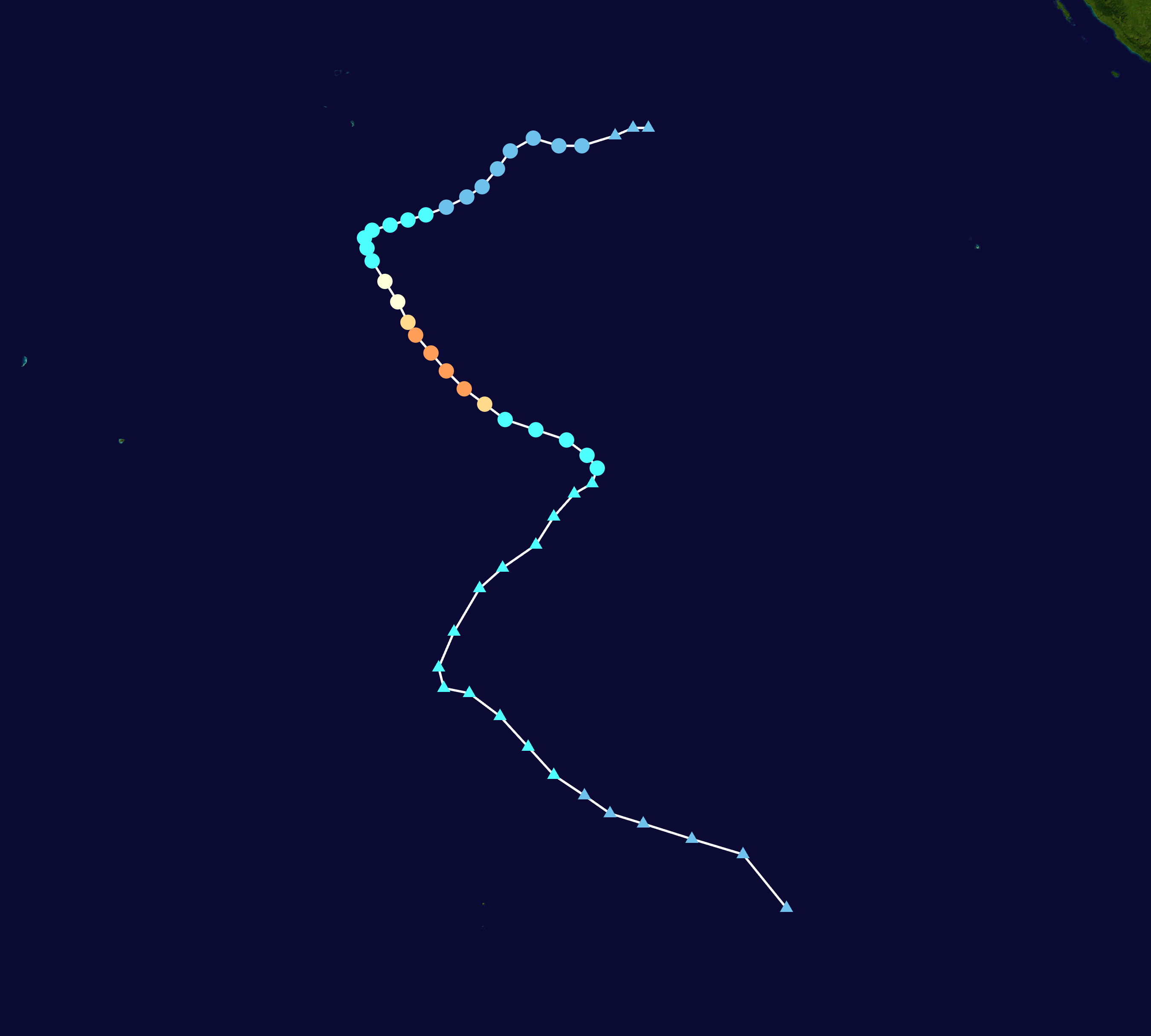
- Duration: March 21 – March 29
- Peak intensity: 165 km/h (105 mph) (10-min); 945 hPa (mbar)

On March 21, a tropical disturbance quickly developed in the monsoon trough in the south-central Indian Ocean, about 1,250 km (780 mi) east of Diego Garcia. A ridge to the south steered the system to the west-southwest, and moderate wind shear in the region prevented significant strengthening. The convection slowly organized, and the depression intensified into Tropical Storm Ikala early on March 25. By that time, the shear had decreased, although initially it was strong enough to prevent the convection from covering the center. An approaching cold front turned the storm to the southeast on March 25, where upper-level conditions became more favorable for strengthening. Thunderstorms increased over the center, and an eye began developing on March 26. The next day, Ikala intensified into a tropical cyclone, reaching peak winds of 165 km/h (103 mph) according to MFR; the JTWC estimated peak 1‑minute winds of 205 km/h (127 mph). Shortly after peaking, increased wind shear and drier air from the front quickly weakened Ikala, and it deteriorated below tropical cyclone status on March 28. That day, the center became exposed from the convection, and on March 29 Ikala became extratropical. The remnants turned to the southwest before recurving to the southeast on March 31, and Ikala was absorbed by a cold front on April 3.

=== Tropical Cyclone Dianne–Jery ===
- Tropical cyclone (MFR)
- Category 3 tropical cyclone (SSHWS)
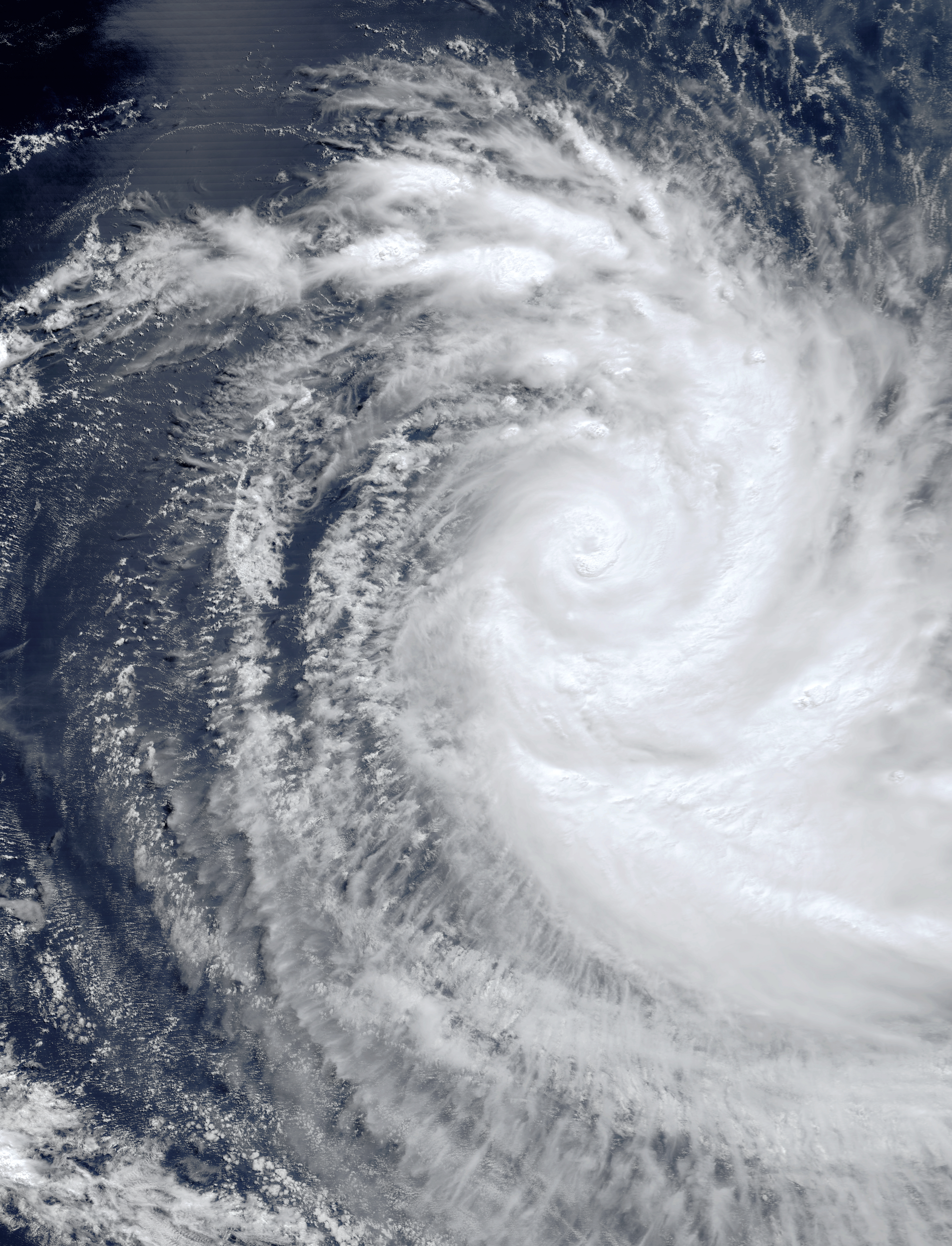
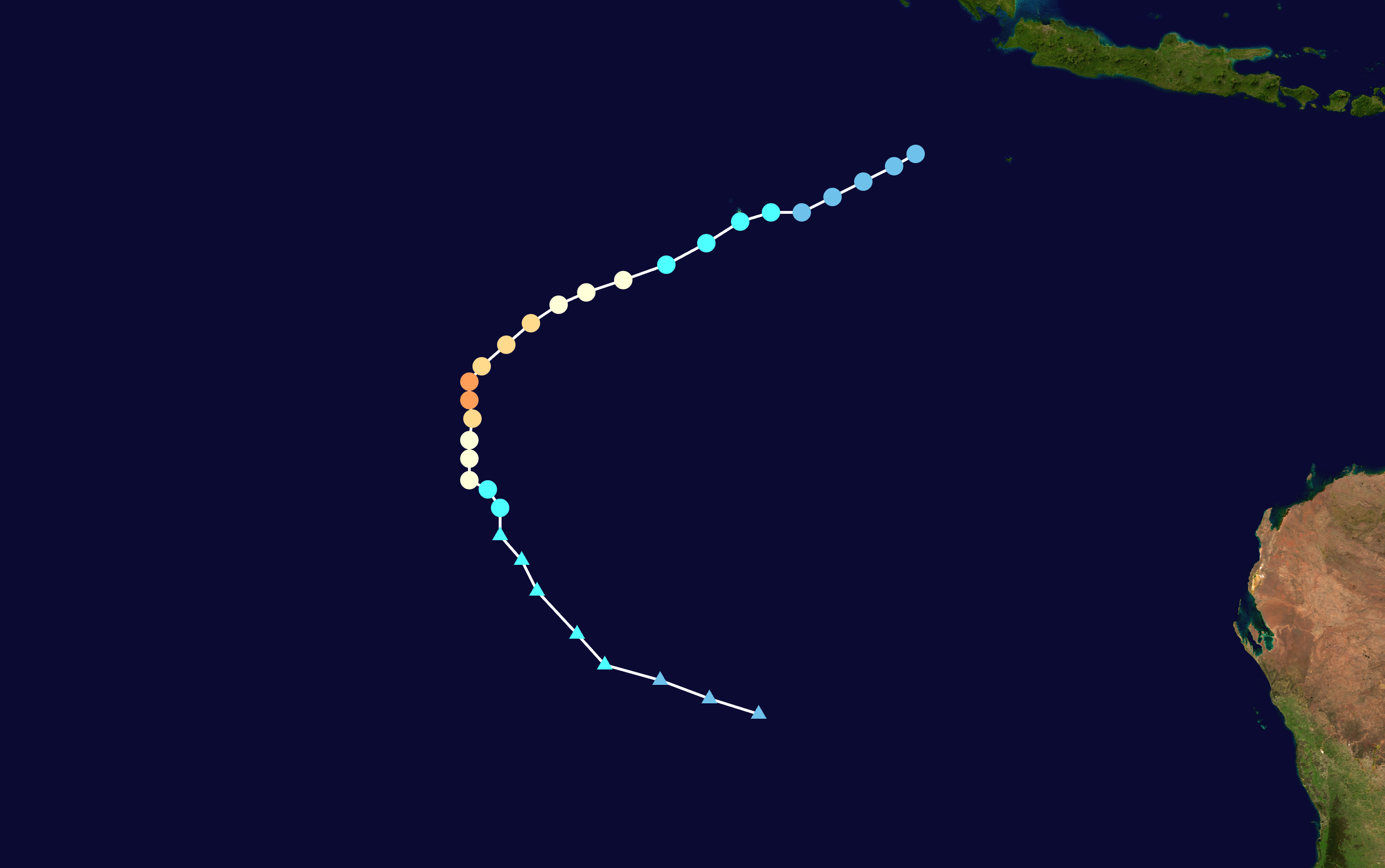
- Duration: April 9 (Entered basin) – April 11
- Peak intensity: 150 km/h (90 mph) (10-min); 955 hPa (mbar)

In early April, the monsoon trough spawned a tropical depression early on April 7 to the northeast of the Cocos Islands in the Australian basin. It moved to the southwest due to a ridge along the west coast of Australia, and quickly intensified into Tropical Cyclone Dianne. Favorable conditions allowed for continued strengthening, and the storm developed a small eye late on April 7. The next day, the storm entered into South-West Indian Ocean and was renamed Jery. Shortly thereafter it intensified into a tropical cyclone, although by that time, the conditions were no longer as favorable for rapid intensification. On April 9, MFR estimated peak 10‑minute winds of 150 km/h (93 mph); around the same time, the JTWC estimated peak 1‑minute winds of 195 km/h (121 mph).

While at peak intensity, Jery began turning to the south, due to reaching the western edge of a ridge. An approaching trough increased wind shear over the storm, causing the convection to diminish and expose the center. Late on April 10 it weakened below tropical cyclone status, and the next day Jery became extratropical. Shortly thereafter the remnants crossed into the Australian region, dissipating on April 13.

=== Tropical Cyclone Kesiny ===
- Tropical cyclone (MFR)
- Category 1 tropical cyclone (SSHWS)
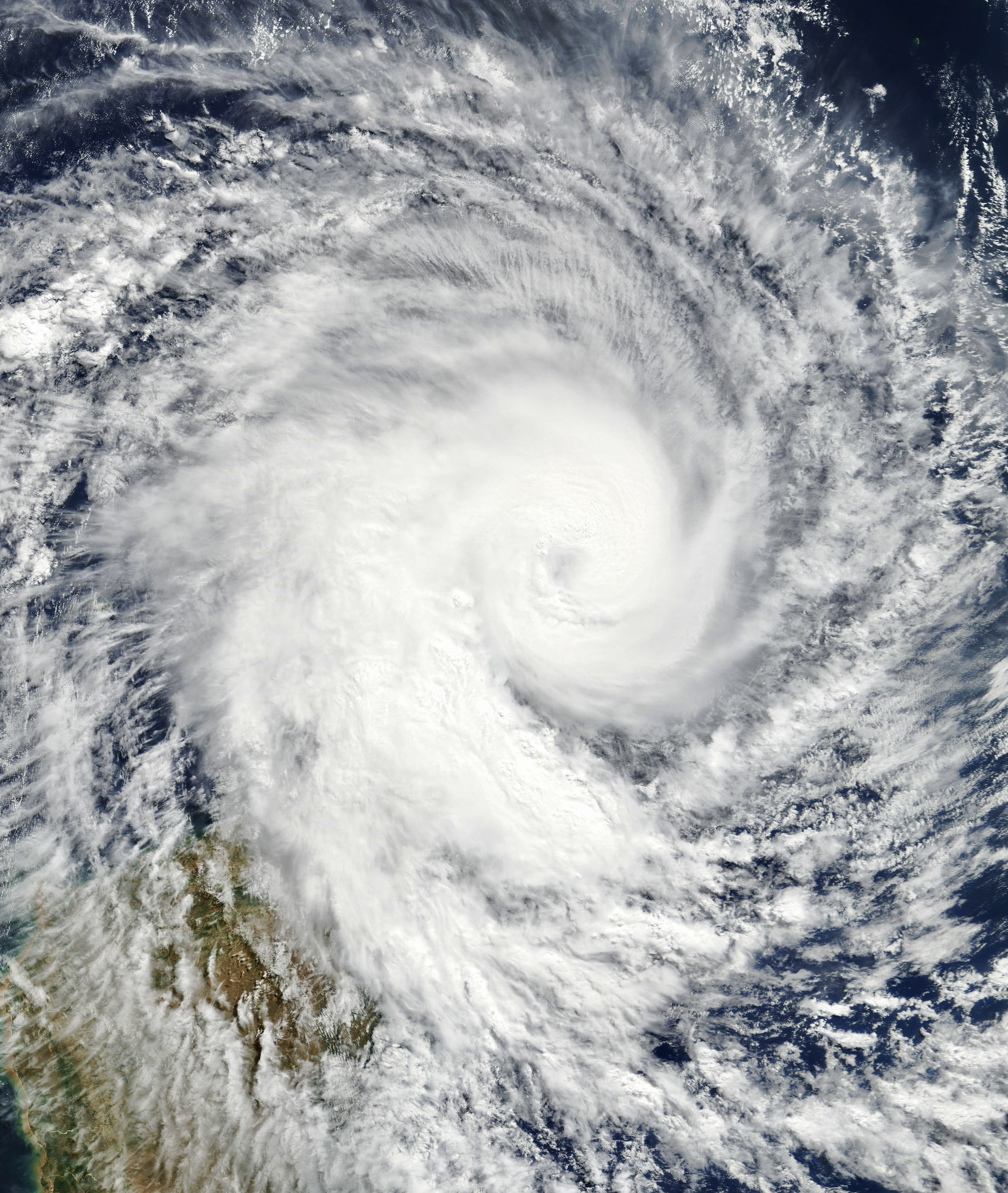
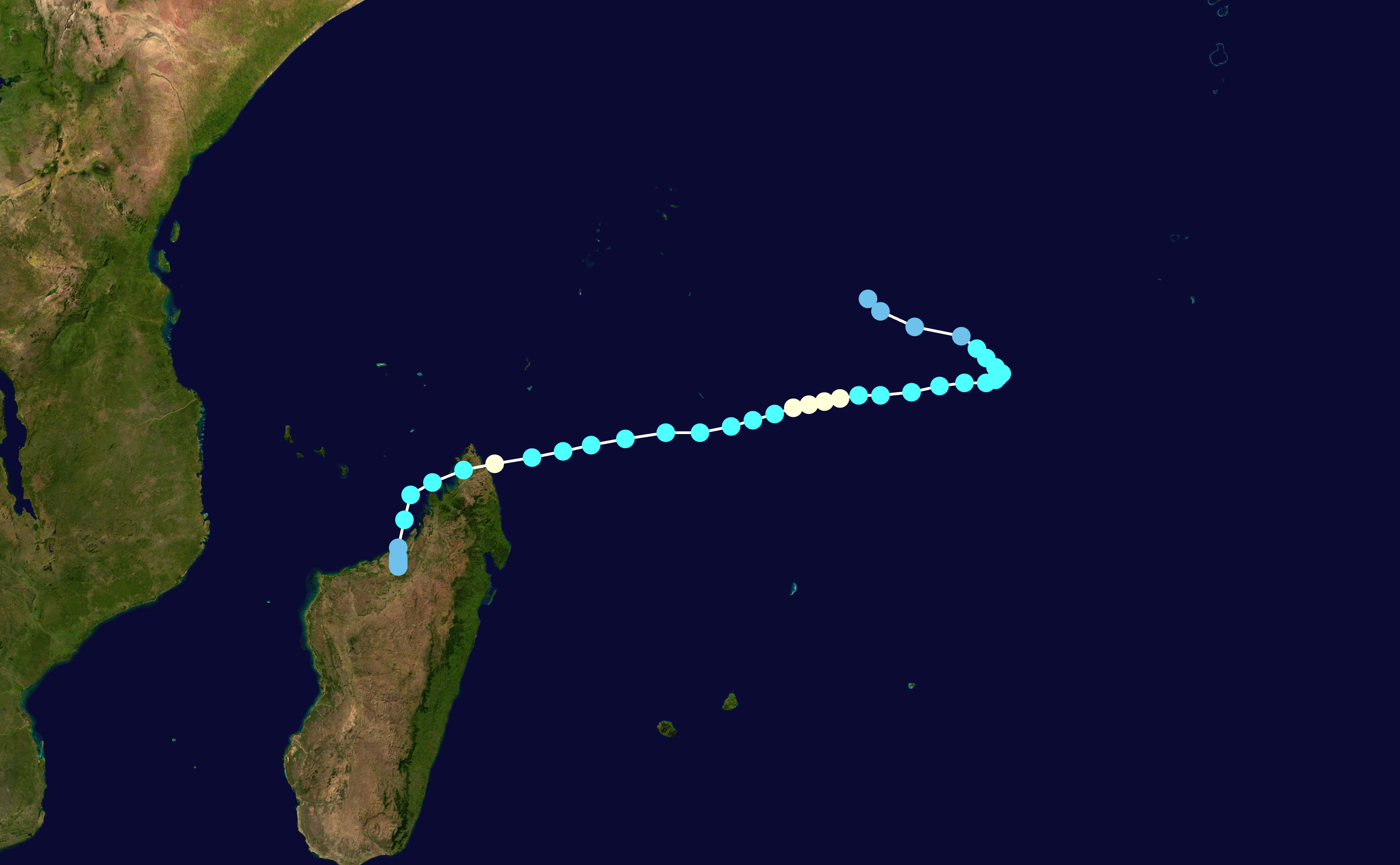
- Duration: May 2 – May 11
- Peak intensity: 130 km/h (80 mph) (10-min); 965 hPa (mbar)

Cyclone Kesiny was the final named storm of the season, forming near the equator on May 2, within a trough enhanced by a pulse of the Madden–Julian oscillation that sparked three other storms. Kesiny initially moved to the southeast, but later turned to the southwest due to a strengthening ridge. On May 6, it intensified into a tropical cyclone, but later weakened and was not expected to re-strengthen. However, Kesiny developed an eye and re-intensified into a tropical cyclone on May 9, reaching peak winds of 130 km/h (81 mph) before striking Madagascar about 60 km (37 mi) southeast of Antsiranana. This made it the first recorded tropical cyclone to make landfall in the month of May in the basin. It weakened while crossing the country, and after turning to the south it struck the country again before dissipating on May 11.

Across Madagascar, Cyclone Kesiny dropped heavy rainfall, reaching 891 mm (35.1 in) in three days at Toamasina (the second largest city in the country). The rains caused mudslides and flooding in the eastern portion of the country, wrecking the rice and maize crops and leaving 5,000 people homeless. At least 33 bridges were destroyed, and many roads were damaged. A total of 33 people were killed, and 1,200 people were injured. The cyclone struck in the midst of a political crisis, in which the top two candidates of the Malagasy presidential election in 2001 declared themselves the winner; the incumbent, who lost, attempted to declare Toamasina the new capital city, and the political instability disrupted relief efforts.

=== Other systems ===
On February 5, a tropical low developed in the Mozambique Channel. Classified as Tropical Disturbance 9 by MFR, the system moved southeastward, dissipating on February 6. The season ended with a tropical disturbance, which formed on June 13 to the east-southeast of Diego Garcia. It moved to the south, and was last monitored on June 15.

== Storm names ==
A tropical disturbance is named when it reaches moderate tropical storm strength. If a tropical disturbance reaches moderate tropical storm status west of 55°E, then the Sub-regional Tropical Cyclone Advisory Centre in Madagascar assigns the appropriate name to the storm; between 55°E and 90°E, the Sub-regional Tropical Cyclone Advisory Centre in Mauritius is responsible for the same task. A new annual list is used every year so no names are retired.

- Andre
- Bako
- Cyprien
- Dina
- Eddy
- Francesca
- Guillaume
- Hary
- Ikala
- Jery
- Kesiny
- Lalita (unused)
- Mirana (unused)
- Naly (unused)
- Orelie (unused)
- Parina (unused)
- Quincy (unused)
- Roger (unused)
- Solo (unused)
- Teddy (unused)
- Usha (unused)
- Vero (unused)
- Wendy (unused)
- Xora (unused)
- Yolande (unused)
- Zaza (unused)

== Season effects ==
This table lists all of the tropical cyclones and subtropical cyclones that were monitored during the 2001–2002 South-West Indian Ocean cyclone season. Information on their intensity, duration, name, and areas affected, primarily comes from RSMC La Reunion. Death and damage reports come from either press reports or the relevant national disaster management agency while the damage totals are given in 2002 USD.

Name	Dates	Peak intensity			Areas affected	Damage (USD)	Deaths	Ref(s).
Name	Dates	Category	Wind speed	Pressure	Areas affected	Damage (USD)	Deaths	Ref(s).
One	October 3–7	Tropical depression	55 km/h (34 mph)	998 hPa (29.47 inHg)	None	None	None	
Alex–Andre	October 28 – November 8	Severe tropical storm	95 km/h (59 mph)	985 hPa (29.09 inHg)	None	None	None	
Three	November 15–23	Tropical depression	55 km/h (34 mph)	998 hPa (29.47 inHg)	None	None	None	
Bessi–Bako	November 30 – December 5	Tropical cyclone	120 km/h (75 mph)	968 hPa (28.59 inHg)	None	None	None	
Cyprien	December 30 – January 3	Severe tropical storm	100 km/h (62 mph)	980 hPa (28.94 inHg)	Madagascar	$180,000	None	
Dina	January 16–25	Intense tropical cyclone	215 km/h (134 mph)	910 hPa (26.87 inHg)	Mauritius, Réunion	$287 million	15	
Eddy	January 22–30	Tropical cyclone	130 km/h (81 mph)	965 hPa (28.50 inHg)	None	None	None	
Francesca	January 30 – February 11	Intense tropical cyclone	195 km/h (121 mph)	925 hPa (27.32 inHg)	None	None	None	
Nine	February 5–6	Tropical disturbance	45 km/h (28 mph)	1,005 hPa (29.68 inHg)	None	None	None	
Guillaume	February 14–23	Intense tropical cyclone	205 km/h (127 mph)	920 hPa (27.17 inHg)	Madagascar, Comoros, Mauritius, Réunion	Unknown	None	
Hary	March 3–13	Very intense tropical cyclone	220 km/h (140 mph)	905 hPa (26.72 inHg)	Madagascar, Mauritius, Réunion	Unknown	4	
Ikala	March 21–29	Intense tropical cyclone	165 km/h (103 mph)	945 hPa (27.91 inHg)	None	None	None	
Dianne-Jery	April 9–11	Tropical cyclone	150 km/h (93 mph)	955 hPa (28.20 inHg)	None	None	None	
Kesiny	May 2–11	Tropical cyclone	140 km/h (87 mph)	965 hPa (28.50 inHg)	Madagascar	Unknown	33	
Fifteen	June 13–15	Tropical disturbance	45 km/h (28 mph)	1,000 hPa (29.53 inHg)	None	None	None	
Season aggregates
15 systems	October 3, 2001 – June 15, 2002		220 km/h (140 mph)	905 hPa (26.72 inHg)		$287.2 million	52	

== See also ==
- List of Southern Hemisphere tropical cyclone seasons
- Tropical cyclones in 2001, 2002
- Atlantic hurricane seasons: 2001, 2002
- Pacific hurricane seasons: 2001, 2002
- Pacific typhoon seasons: 2001, 2002
- North Indian Ocean cyclone seasons: 2001, 2002
