= Ravine du Chaudron =

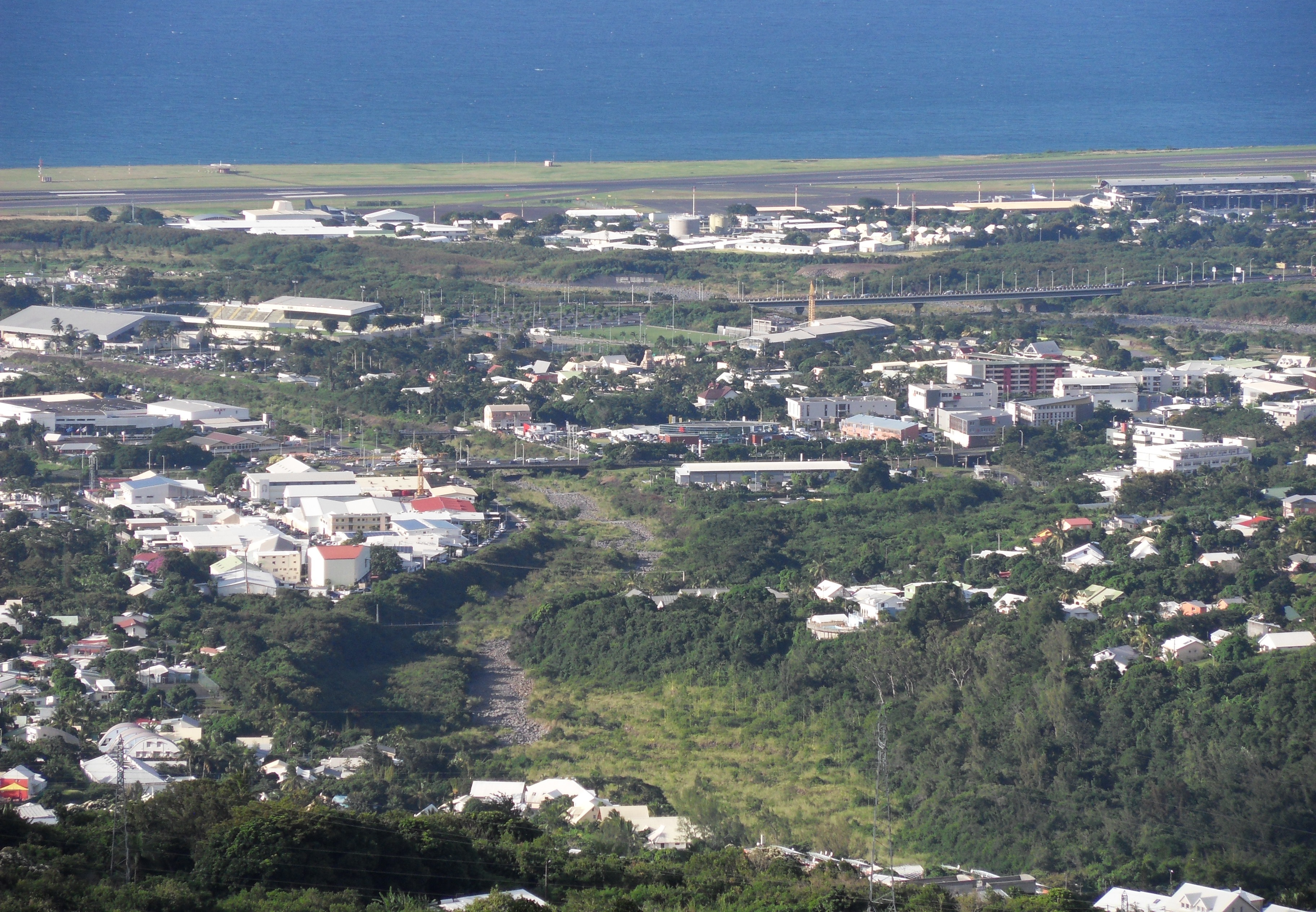

Location
- Country: France
- Region: Réunion

Physical characteristics
- Mouth: Indian Ocean
  - coordinates: 20°53′01″S 55°29′49″E
- Length: 14.8 km (9.2 mi)

Ravine du Chaudron is a river in Réunion. It is 14.8 km (9.2 mi) long. It flows into the Indian Ocean near Saint-Denis.
