= 2003 Pacific hurricane season =

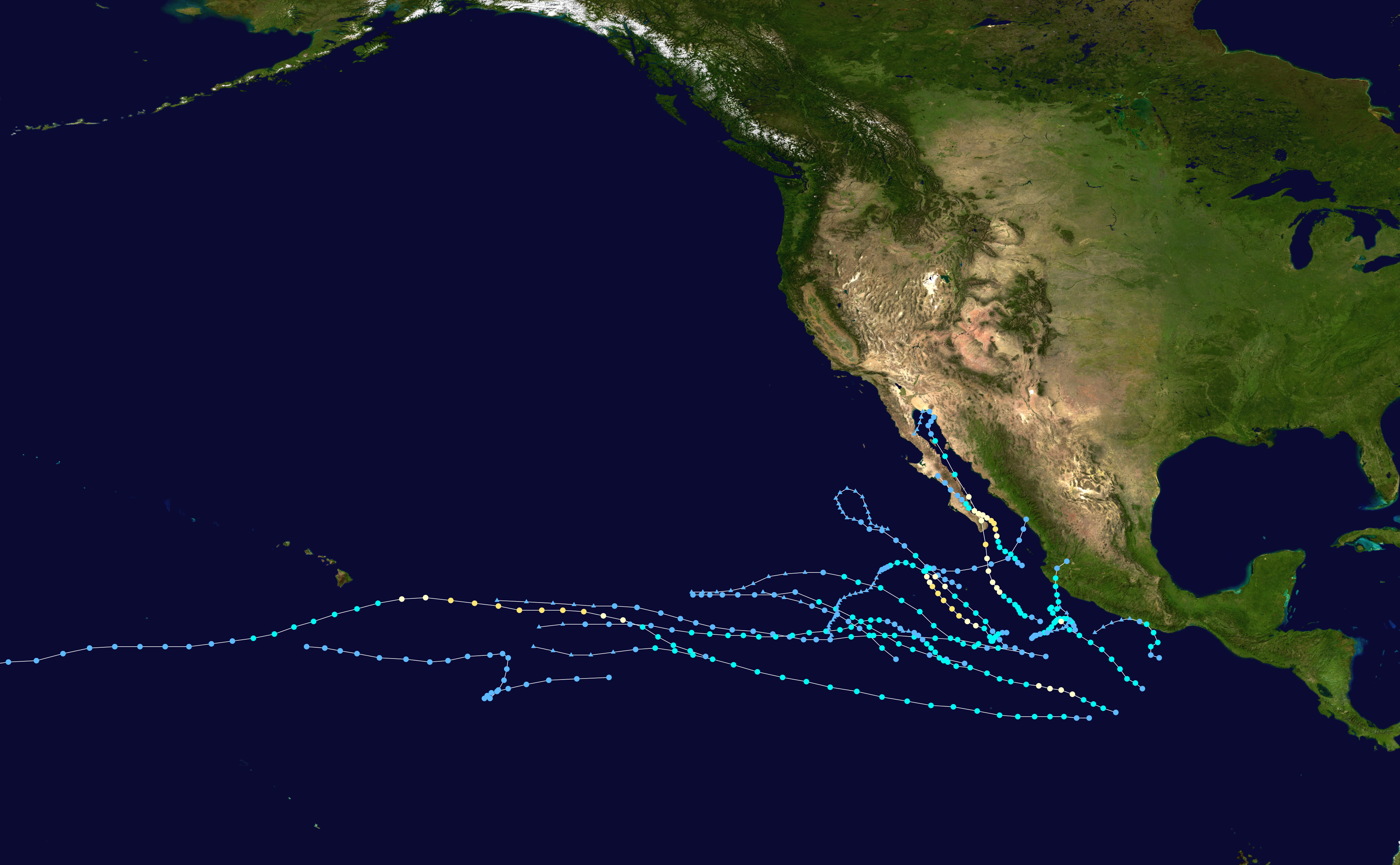
- Season summary map

Seasonal boundaries
- First system formed: May 19, 2003
- Last system dissipated: October 26, 2003

Strongest storm
- Name: Nora
  - Maximum winds: 105 mph (165 km/h) (1-minute sustained)
  - Lowest pressure: 969 mbar (hPa; 28.61 inHg)

Seasonal statistics
- Total depressions: 17
- Total storms: 16
- Hurricanes: 7
- Major hurricanes (Cat. 3+): 0 (record low, tied with 1977)
- Total fatalities: 26 total
- Total damage: $129 million (2003 USD)

Related articles
- Timeline of the 2003 Pacific hurricane season; 2003 Atlantic hurricane season; 2003 Pacific typhoon season; 2003 North Indian Ocean cyclone season

The 2003 Pacific hurricane season was the first season to feature no major hurricanes (storms of Category 3 intensity or higher on the Saffir–Simpson hurricane wind scale) since 1977. The season officially began on May 15, 2003 in the Eastern North Pacific (east of 140°W), and on June 1 in the Central (between 140°W and the International Date Line); both ended on November 30. These dates, adopted by convention, historically describe the period in each year when most tropical cyclogenesis occurs in these regions of the Pacific. The season featured 16 tropical storms, 7 of which intensified into hurricanes, which was then considered an average season. Damage across the basin reached US$129 million, and 23 people were killed by the storms. (Note: All damage totals are in 2003 values of their respective currencies.)

Despite the overall lack of activity, the season produced an unusually large number of tropical cyclones that affected Mexico, with eight tropical cyclones making landfall on either side of Mexico, which was the second highest on record. Tropical Storm Carlos struck Oaxaca in late June, resulting in nine fatalities. In late August, Hurricane Ignacio struck the Baja California peninsula, killing four people and inflicting US$21 million in damage. In September, Hurricane Marty affected the same areas as Ignacio, and was responsible for 12 casualties and US$100 million in damage, making Marty the costliest and deadliest storm of the season. In October, hurricanes Olaf and Nora struck western Mexico as tropical depressions, causing slight damage and one casualty.

Activity in the Central Pacific was below average, with only one tropical depression forming in the basin and one hurricane entering the basin from the East Pacific. In mid-August, Hurricane Jimena passed just to the south of Hawaiʻi; it was the first storm to directly threaten Hawaii in several years. Also, the remnants of Tropical Storm Guillermo moved into the basin on August 12, prior dissipating the following day.

== Seasonal forecasts ==
Predictions of tropical activity in the 2003 season
Source	Date	Named storms	Hurricanes	Major hurricanes	Ref
Eastern	Average (1981–2010)	16	9	4
Eastern - SMN	May 13, 2003	15	6	2
Eastern - NOAA	June 12, 2003	11–15	6–9	2–5
Eastern	Actual activity	16	7	0
Central	Average	4–5	1	–
Central - NOAA	May 19, 2003	2–3	–	–
Central	Actual activity	1	1	0

On May 16, 2003, the Servicio Meteorológico Nacional (SMN, National Meteorological Service) released their prediction for tropical cyclone activity in the eastern Pacific. A total of 15 named storms, 6 hurricanes, and 2 major hurricanes was forecast. Three later days, National Oceanic and Atmospheric Administration (NOAA) issued its Central Pacific hurricane season forecast, calling for a slightly below-average level of activity due to the expected development of La Niña. La Niña conditions generally restrict tropical cyclone development in the Northeast Pacific, which is the opposite of its effect in the Atlantic. On June 12, 2003, NOAA issued a forecast for the East Pacific hurricane season – the first time it had done so. The scientists expected that La Niña conditions would develop, and predicted a 50 percent chance of below normal activity and a 40 percent chance of near normal activity.

== Seasonal summary ==
Least intense Pacific hurricane seasons
Rank	Season	ACE value
1	1977	22.3
2	2010	51.2
3	2007	51.6
4	1996	53.9
5	2003	56.6
6	1979	57.4
7	2004	71.1
8	1981	72.8
9	2013	74.8
10	2020	77.3

There were 16 named storms and 7 hurricanes during the 2003 Pacific hurricane season, which is comparable with the long-term averages. For the first time since 1977, there were no major hurricanes, where the long-term average is four. (Major hurricanes are storms of Category 3 intensity or higher on the Saffir–Simpson hurricane wind scale.) The first hurricane, Ignacio, formed on August 24. This is the latest formation of the first hurricane of a season recorded in the East Pacific since reliable satellite observation began in 1966. The accumulated cyclone energy (ACE) index for the 2003 Pacific hurricane season, at 53.4 units in the Eastern Pacific and 3.3 units in the Central Pacific, places the season among the top 10 least active seasons since 1971, when reliable records began.

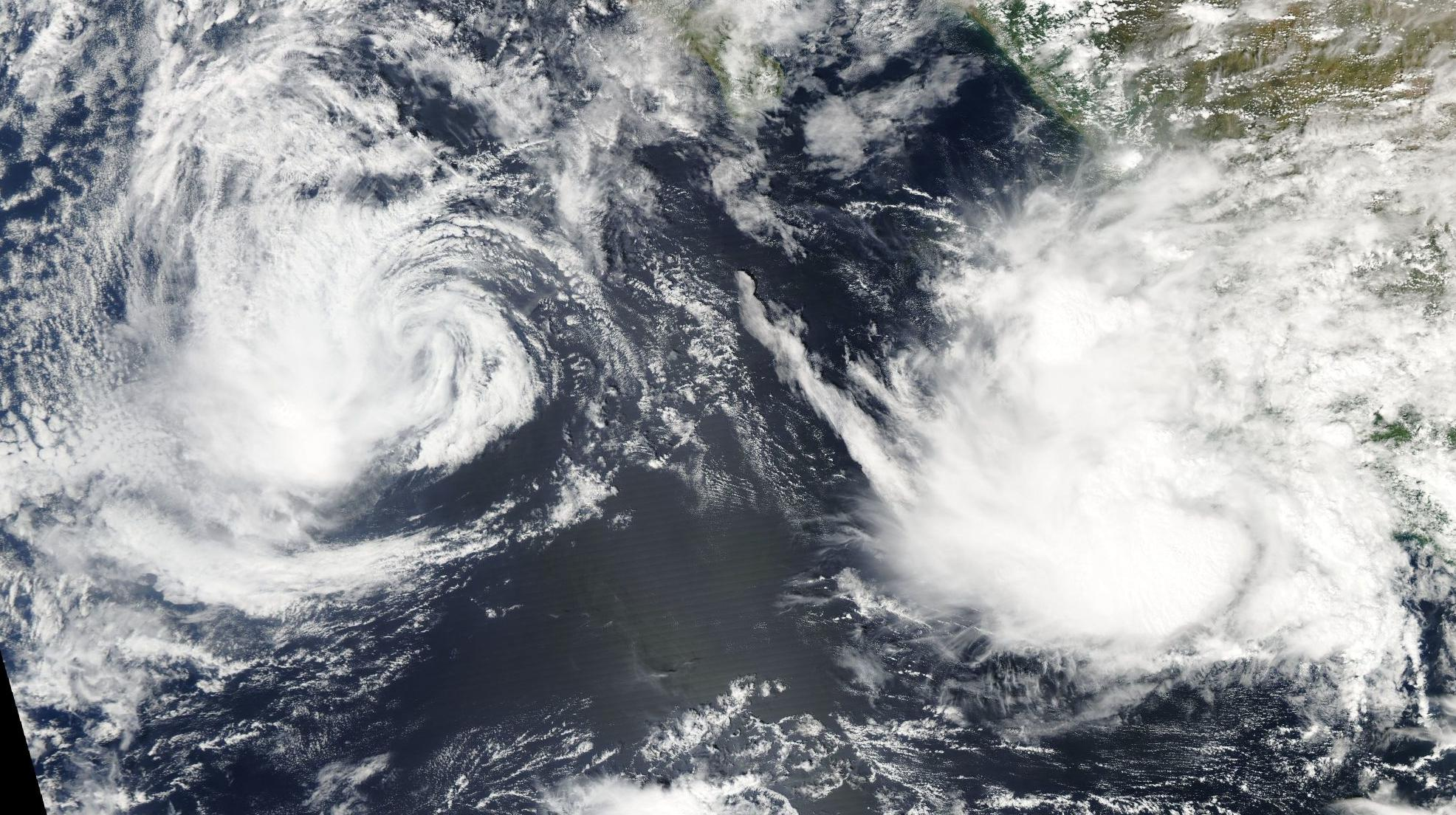
In the eastern Pacific, two simultaneous hurricanes on October 6, Nora (left) and Olaf (right)

While the total activity was below average, there was an unusually high number of landfalls in Mexico. Eight Pacific and North Atlantic tropical cyclones had a direct impact in Mexico in 2003, second only to 1971, when nine did so. This is well above the long-term average of 4.2 Atlantic and East Pacific storms affecting Mexico. Five Pacific storms impacted Mexico; Hurricanes Ignacio and Marty both made landfall in the state of Baja California Sur at hurricane intensity. Two other storms hit mainland Mexico as tropical storms and a third as a tropical depression. Three storms hit Mexico within a very short space of time: the Pacific hurricanes Nora and Olaf, and the Atlantic Tropical Storm Larry. As a result of the flooding caused by these storms, disaster areas were declared in 14 states.

Activity in the Central Pacific was below average, with only one tropical depression forming in the basin and one hurricane entering the basin from the East Pacific. A third system, Tropical Storm Guillermo, weakened to a remnant low just to the east of the Central Pacific Hurricane Center's area of responsibility. Although activity was generally low, Hurricane Jimena was the first direct threat to the Hawaiian Islands for several years and a hurricane watch was issued for the island of Hawaii. Jimena passed to the south, but still brought tropical-storm-force gusts and heavy rain to the island.

== Systems ==
=== Tropical Storm Andres ===
- Tropical storm (SSHWS)
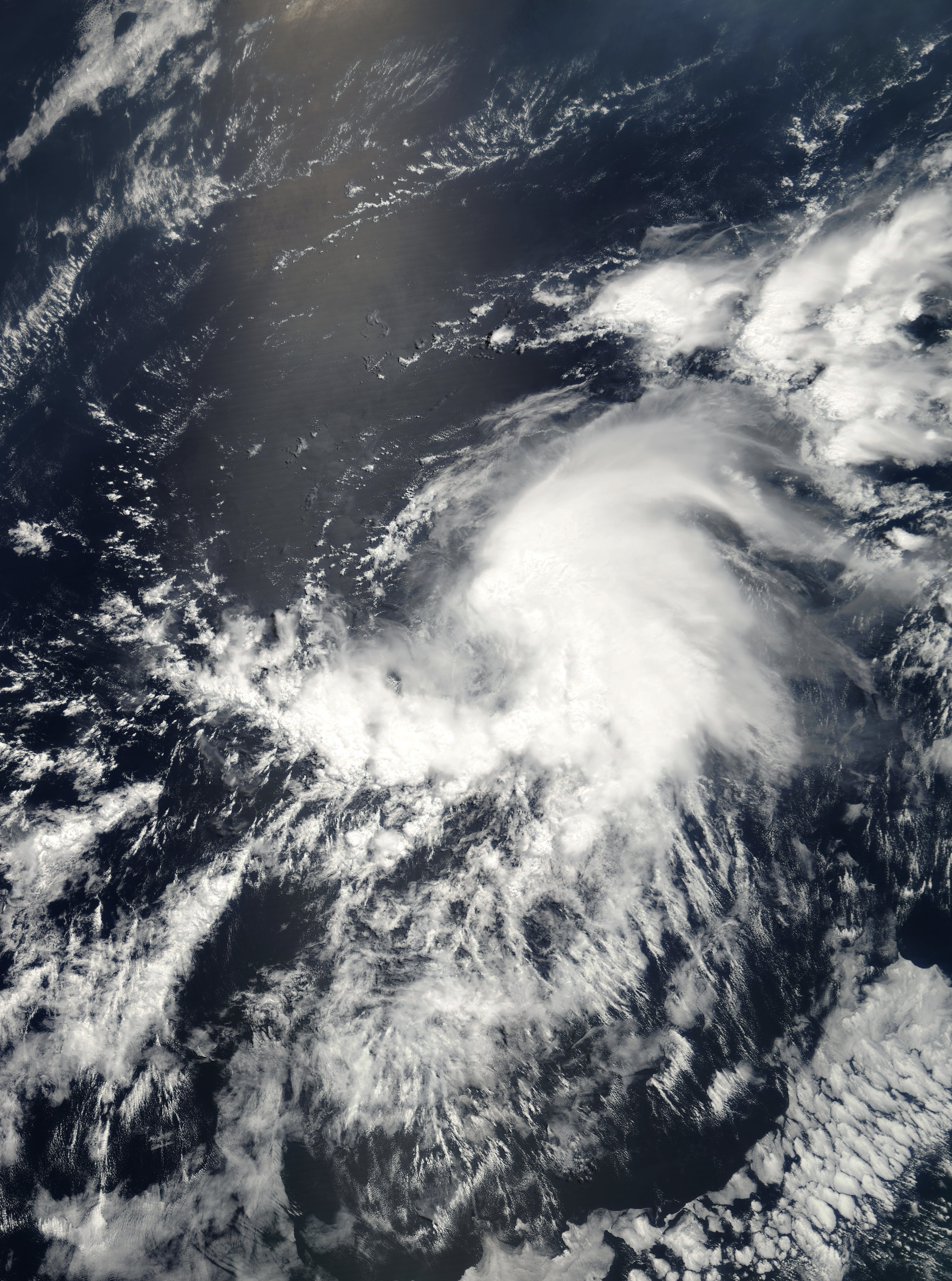
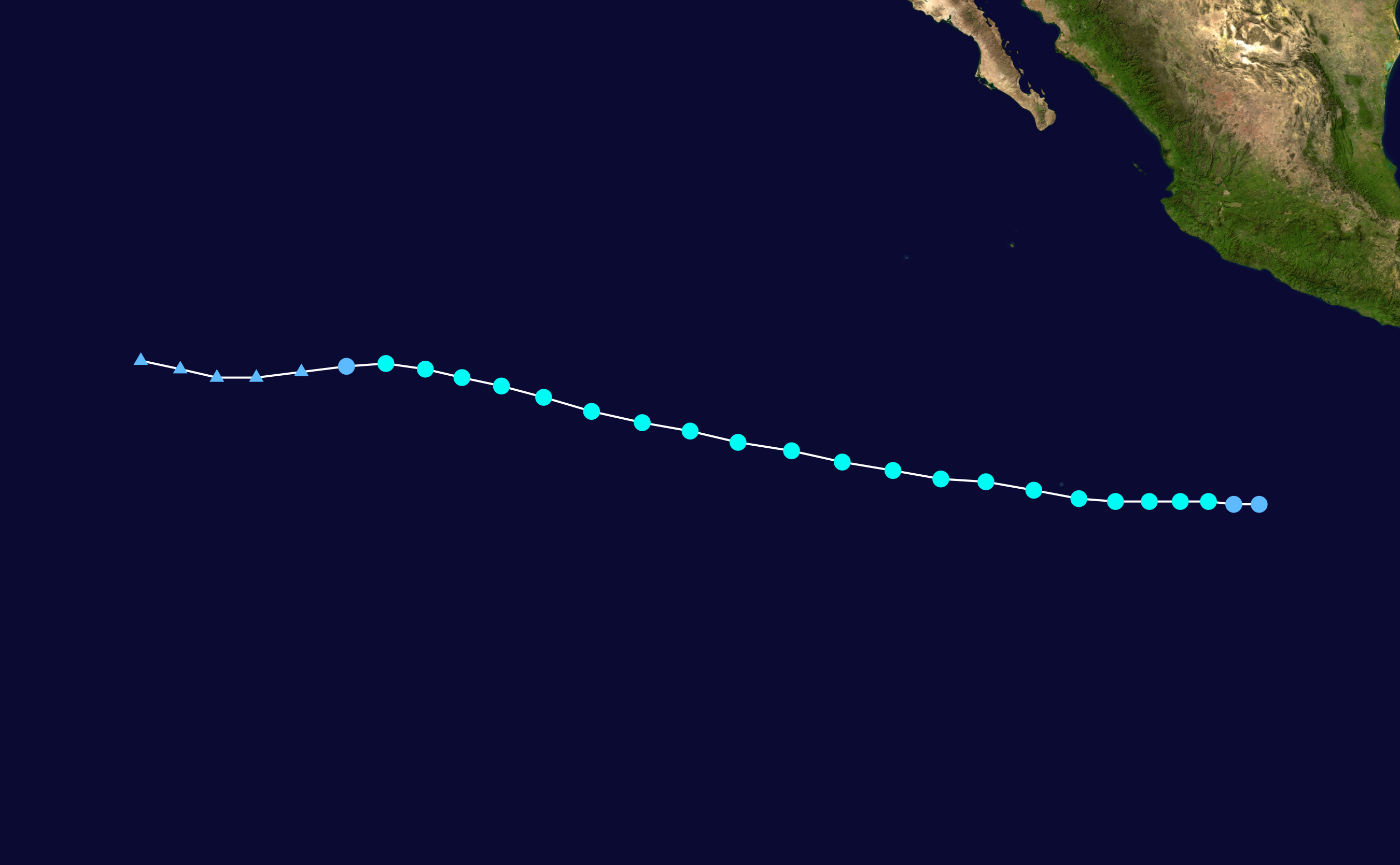
- Duration: May 19 – May 25
- Peak intensity: 60 mph (95 km/h) (1-min); 997 mbar (hPa)

An area of disturbed weather developed south of Guatemala on May 10 within a broad area of low pressure. While tracking westward, the disturbance became classifiable by the Dvorak technique on May 18. Following the development of a closed low-level circulation, the disturbance was classified as a tropical depression around 18:00 UTC on May 19 roughly 1,060 mi (1,710 km) south-southeast of Cabo San Lucas. The depression strengthened into Tropical Storm Andres the next day. Despite increasing wind shear from an anticyclone causing the system's convection to become displaced from the circulation, overall banding features improved, and Andres obtained its peak strength with winds of 60 mph (97 km/h) by 1800 UTC on May 20. A further increase in shear, soon followed by a decrease in ocean temperatures, caused Andres to weaken on May 25. It was downgraded to a tropical depression on May 25, became a post-tropical cyclone at 12:00 UTC that day, and dissipated on May 26 without affecting land.

=== Tropical Storm Blanca ===
- Tropical storm (SSHWS)
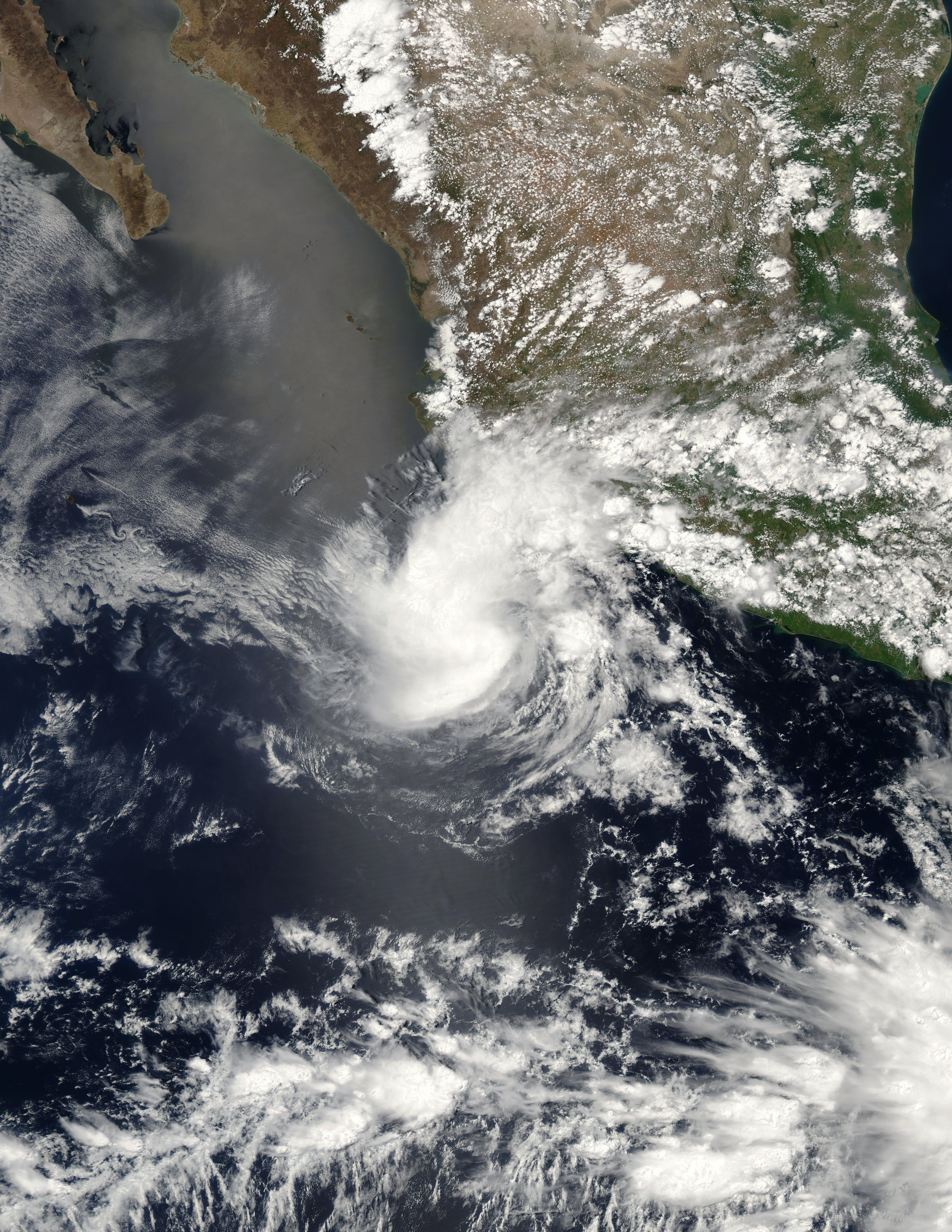
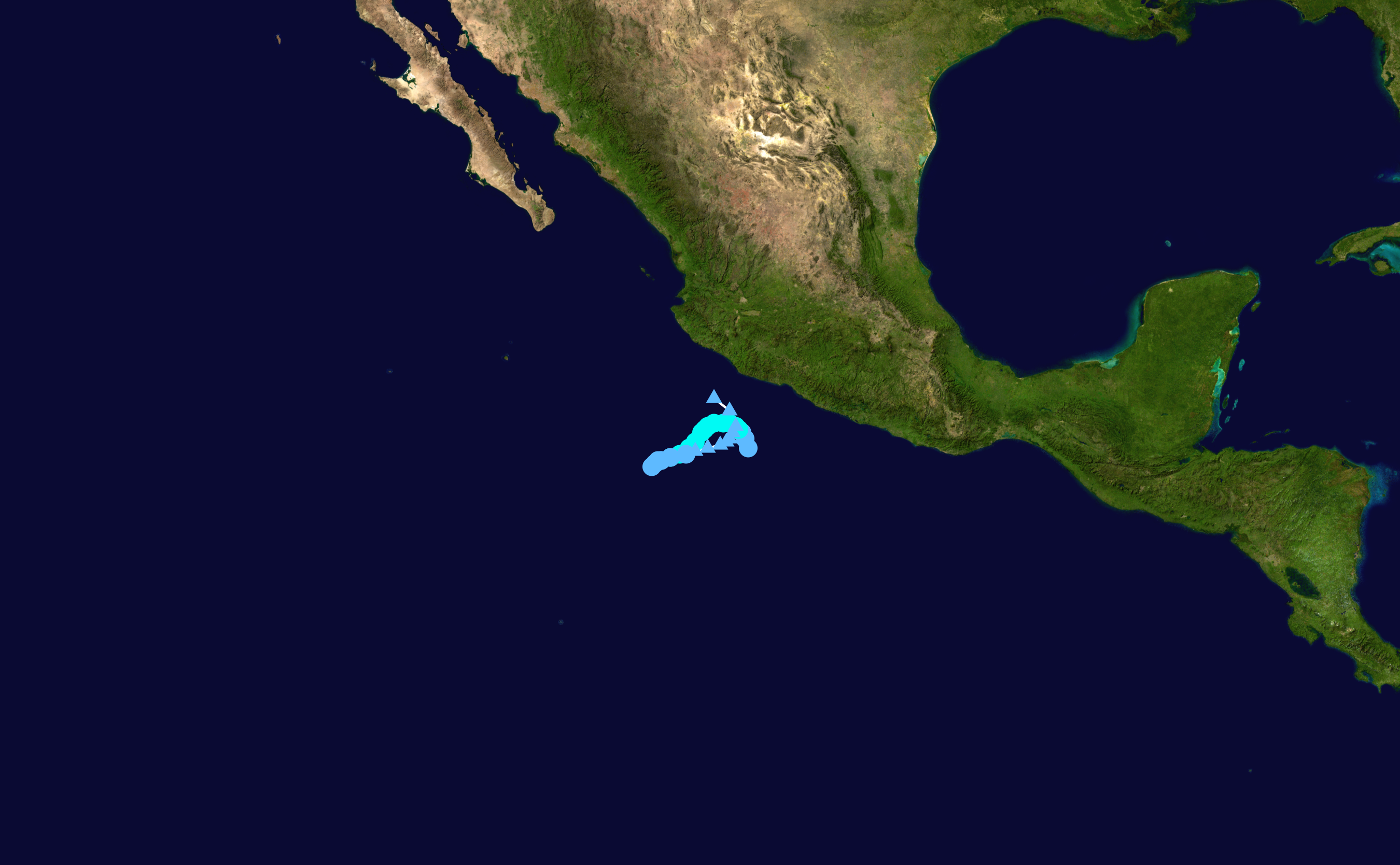
- Duration: June 17 – June 22
- Peak intensity: 60 mph (95 km/h) (1-min); 997 mbar (hPa)

In mid-June, a tropical wave interacted with a lingering area of disturbed weather near the southwestern Mexican coast. Following an increase in organization, the combined disturbance was classified as a tropical depression at 00:00 UTC on June 17. The storm strengthened and became Tropical Storm Blanca 12 hours later. The storm moved slowly to the west and reached its peak on June 18 with 60 mph (97 km/h) winds; around this time, the cyclone displayed an eye-like feature on weather satellite. Under the influence of strong shear from the southeast, Blanca began to weaken and move erratically, although intermittent bursts of deep convection continued. The storm degenerated to a tropical depression on June 20 and a post-tropical cyclone by 12:00 UTC on June 22. The remnants of Blanca were tracked for an additional two days. There were no effects from Blanca on land.

=== Tropical Storm Carlos ===
- Tropical storm (SSHWS)
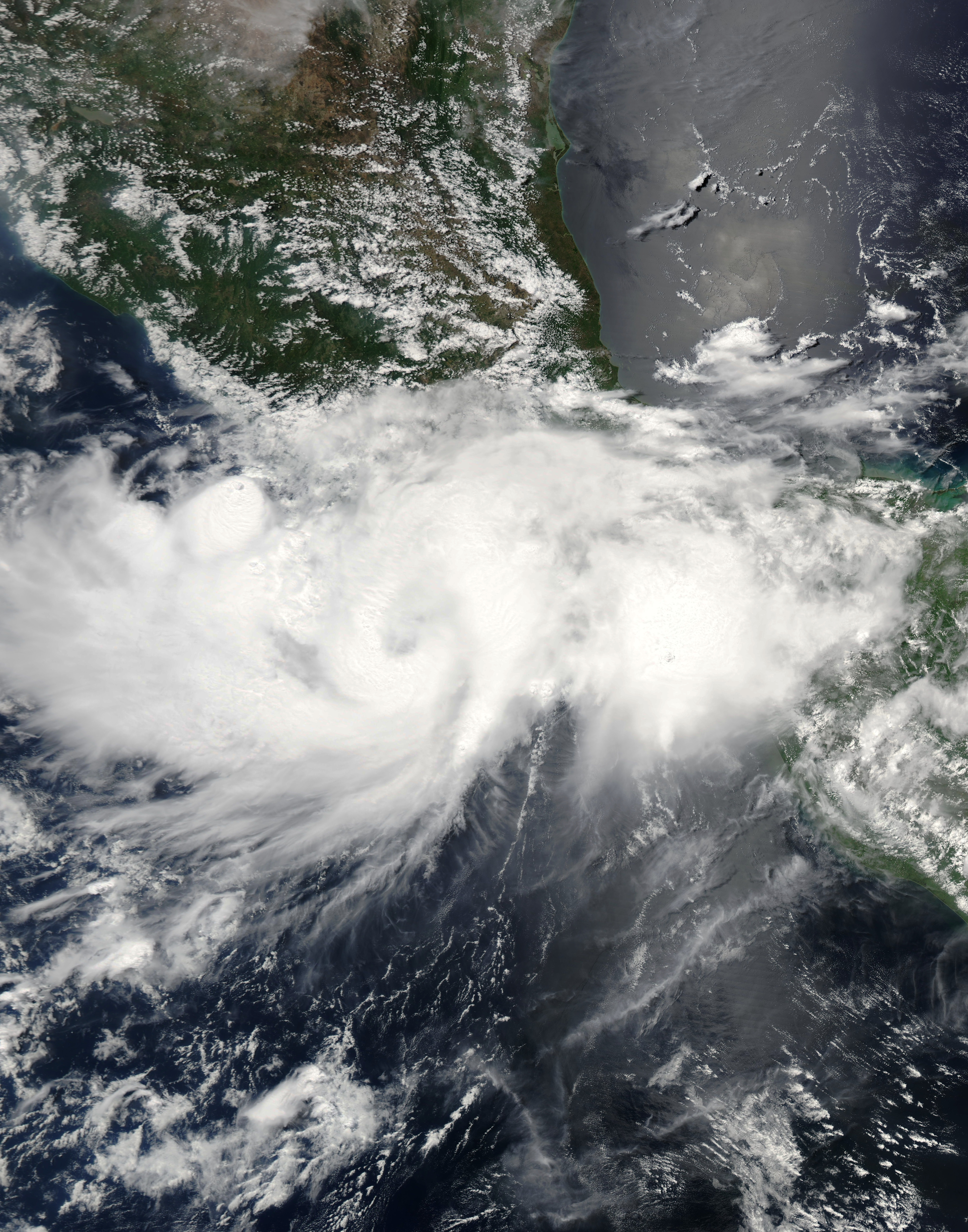
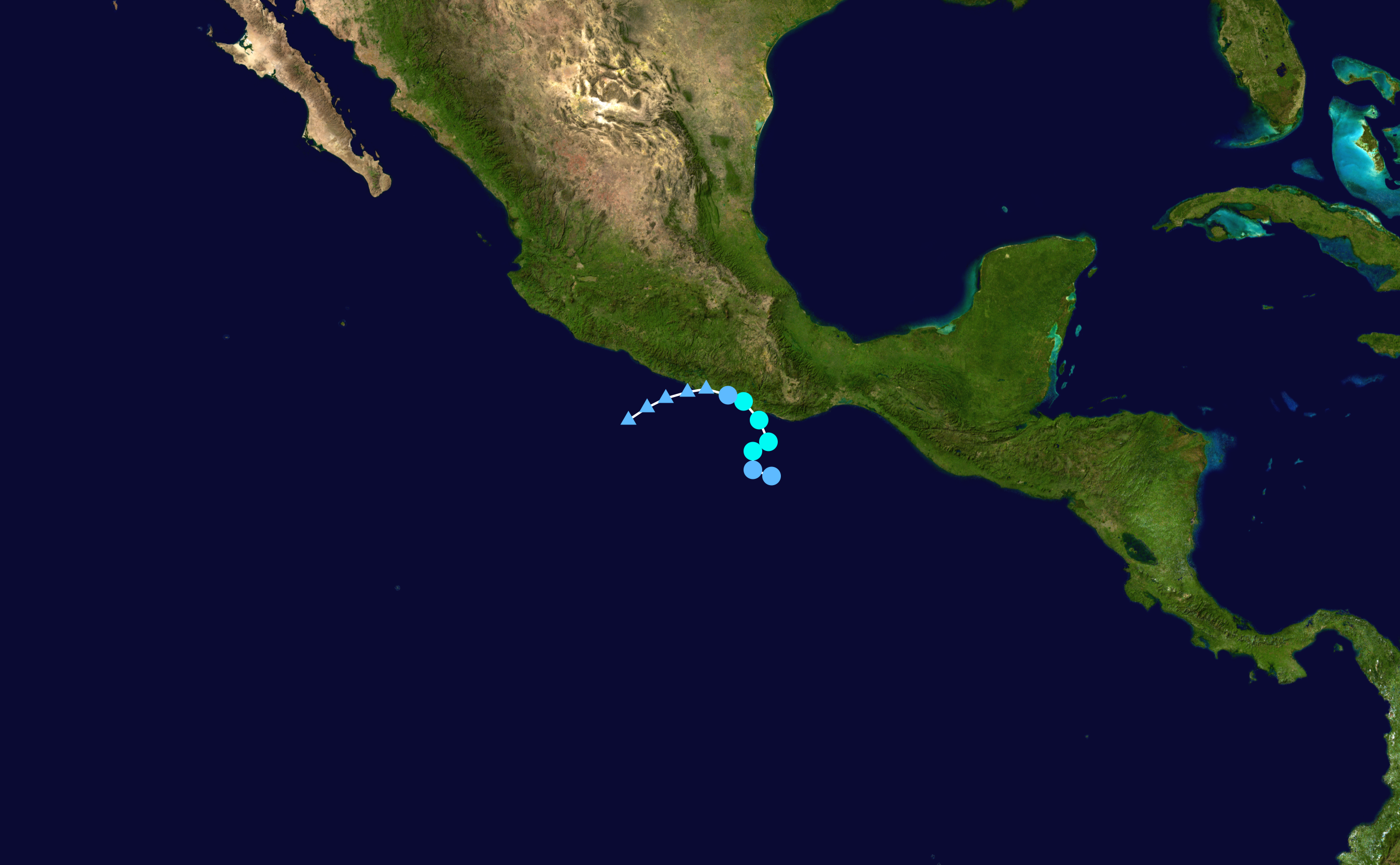
- Duration: June 26 – June 27
- Peak intensity: 65 mph (100 km/h) (1-min); 996 mbar (hPa)

Tropical Storm Carlos formed from a tropical wave that crossed Central America on June 20. After gradually organizing, the wave was designated a tropical depression at 00:00 UTC on June 26 and further upgraded to Tropical Storm Carlos after twelve hours. The system moved generally northward and developed an eye, which was visible on Puerto Ángel radar. Carlos attained peak winds of 65 mph (105 km/h) shortly before making landfall about 60 miles (97 km) west of Puerto Escondido, or about 150 mi (240 km) east-southeast of Acapulco. The storm rapidly deteriorated to a remnant low by 18:00 UTC on June 27, which persisted until dissipation on June 29.

Carlos produced heavy rainfall across portions of southern Mexico, peaking at 337 mm (13.3 in) in two locations in Guerrero. In northwestern Oaxaca, seven people were killed when the heavy rainfall triggered a mudslide. Mudslides were reported elsewhere in the state, and about 30,000 homes were damaged. Throughout its path, the storm affected about 148,000 people. Monetary damage totaled 86.7 million pesos (2003 MXN, US$8 million). (Note: All currencies are converted from Mexican pesos to United States Dollars using this with an exchange rate of the year 2003.) In addition to the seven deaths across Oaxaca, two fishermen were reported missing.

=== Tropical Storm Dolores ===
- Tropical storm (SSHWS)
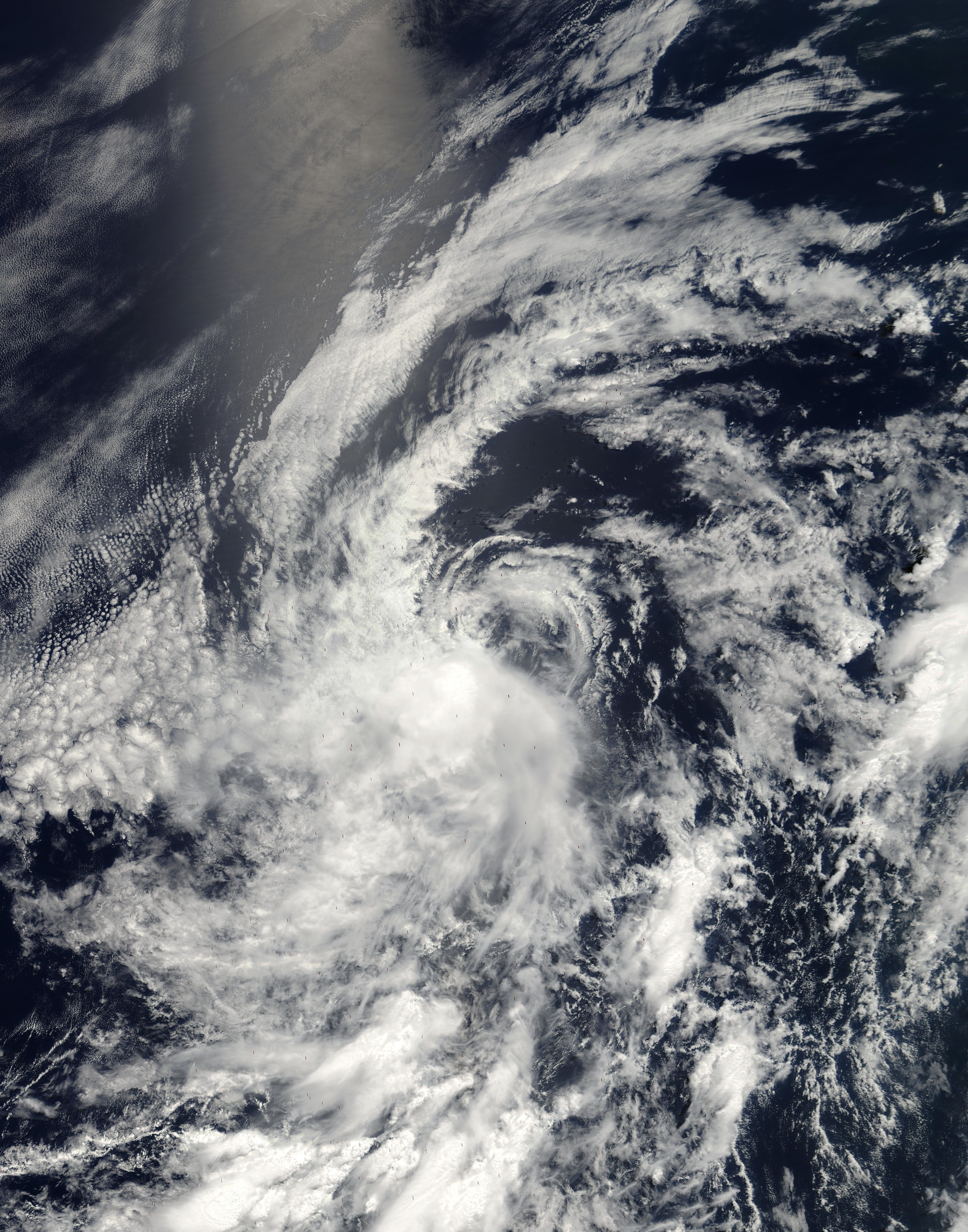
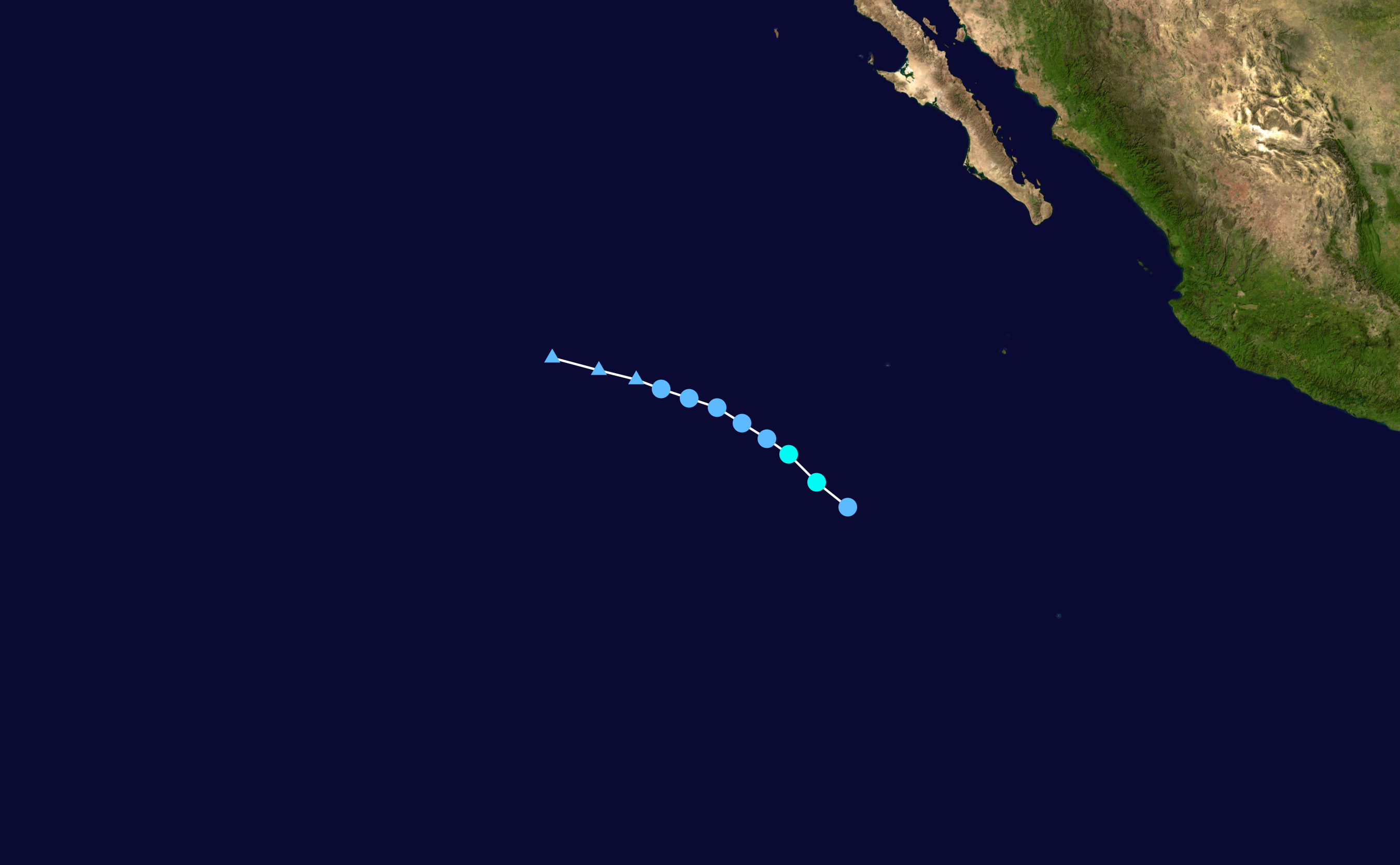
- Duration: July 6 – July 8
- Peak intensity: 40 mph (65 km/h) (1-min); 1005 mbar (hPa)

A tropical wave entered the East Pacific on June 30 and four days later became classifiable by the Dvorak technique while south of Manzanillo, Colima. Convection coalesced around an area of low pressure as it moved west. The disturbance organized into Tropical Depression Four-E by 06:00 UTC on July 6 about 750 mi (1,205 km) to the south-southwest of Baja California Sur. It soon strengthened further, becoming Tropical Storm Dolores and reaching its peak intensity with winds of 40 mph (64 km/h) six hours later. This peak was short-lived as an increase in east-northeasterly shear stripped the storm of its convection and caused it weaken back to a tropical depression on July 7. The northwest motion caused by a mid-level ridge north and northeast of the cyclone brought it over colder water, and the system degenerated into a post-tropical remnant low around 06:00 UTC on July 8. Dissipation occurred the next day.

=== Tropical Storm Enrique ===
- Tropical storm (SSHWS)
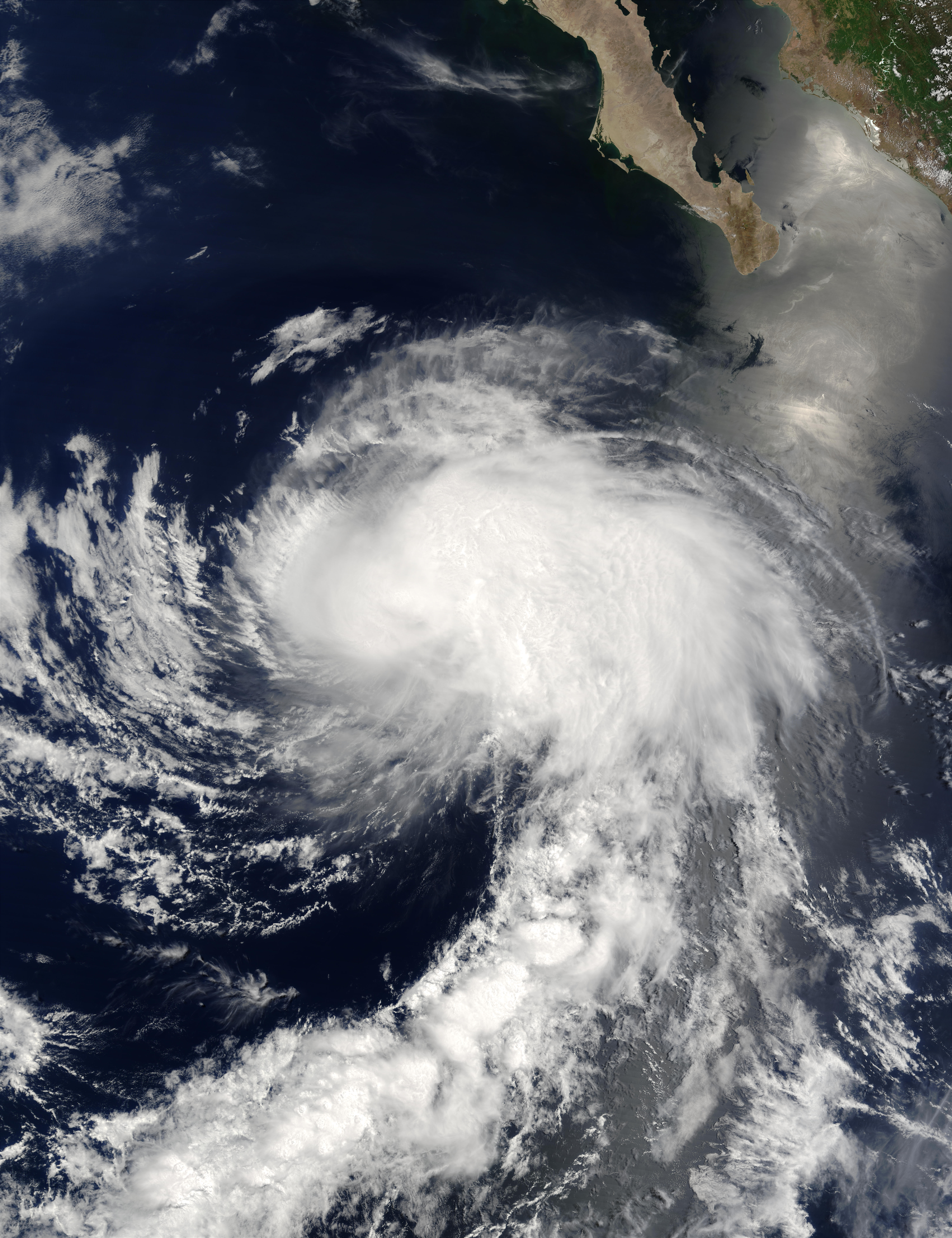
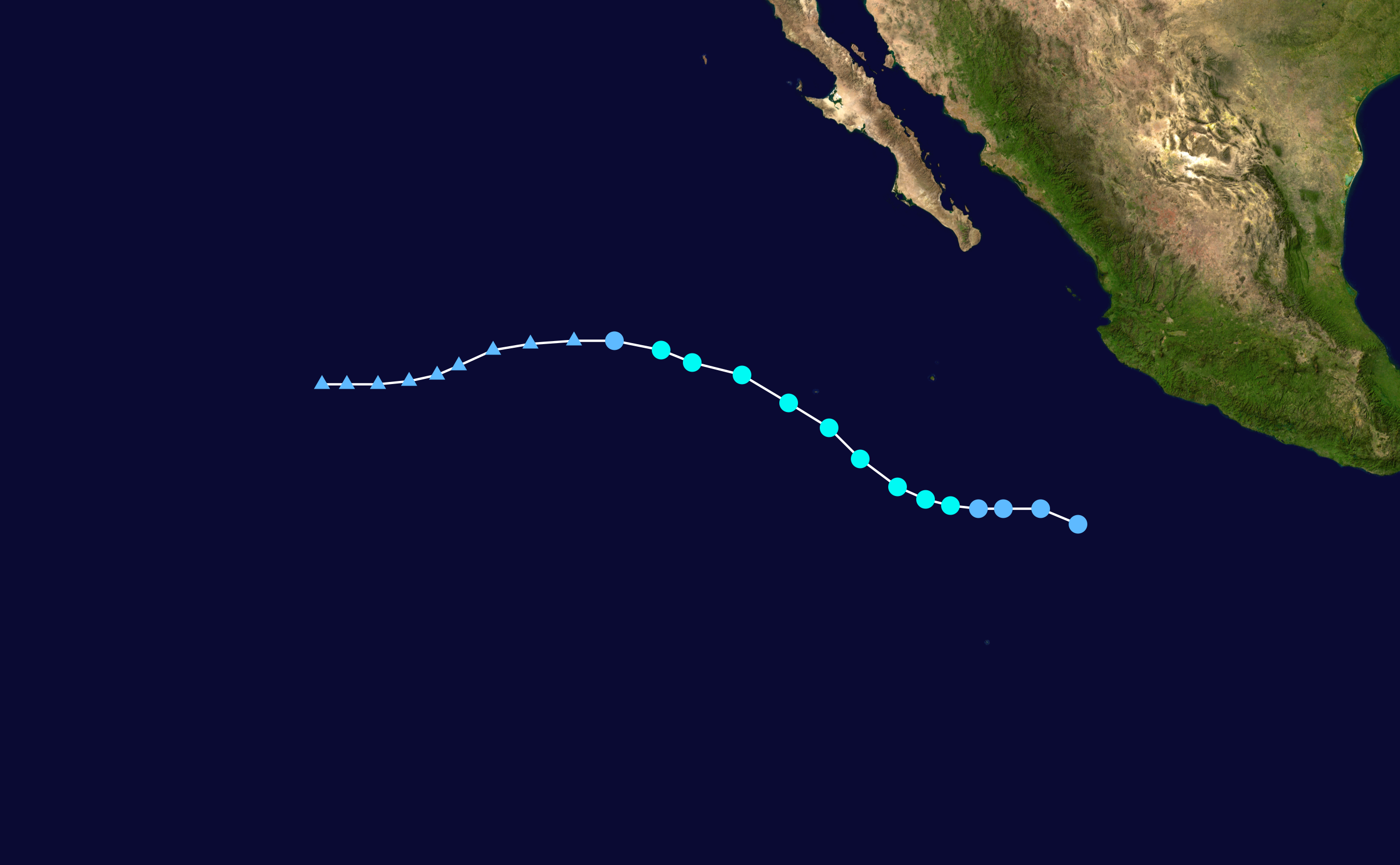
- Duration: July 10 – July 13
- Peak intensity: 65 mph (100 km/h) (1-min); 993 mbar (hPa)

On July 6, a tropical wave entered the Northeastern Pacific Ocean. An area of low pressure developed and began to show signs of organization on July 9. The disturbance was designated a tropical depression around 12:00 UTC on July 10 while located about 650 mi (1,045 km) south-southeast of Baja California Sur. The storm became more organized and was named Tropical Storm Enrique 24 hours later as it tracked west-northwest. As Enrique strengthened and upper-level outflow expanded in all directions, forecasters briefly anticipated it to become a hurricane. The cyclone instead peaked with winds of 65 mph (105 km/h) early on July 12, after which point it encountered cool waters at a high latitude. Accordingly, Enrique rapidly weakened despite low wind shear. The storm degenerated into a remnant low around 00:00 UTC on July 14 and continued to move west before dissipating three days later.

=== Tropical Storm Felicia ===
- Tropical storm (SSHWS)
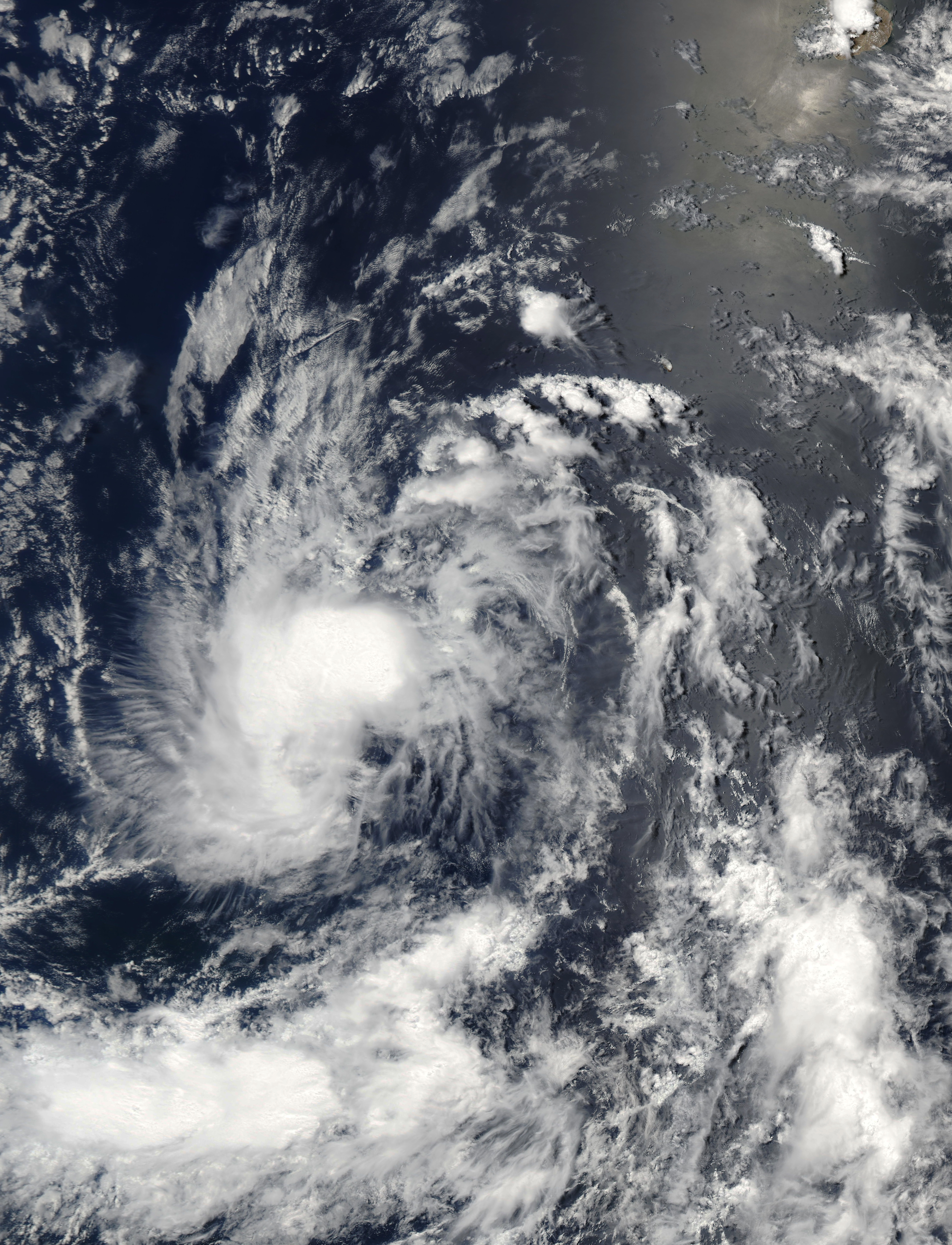
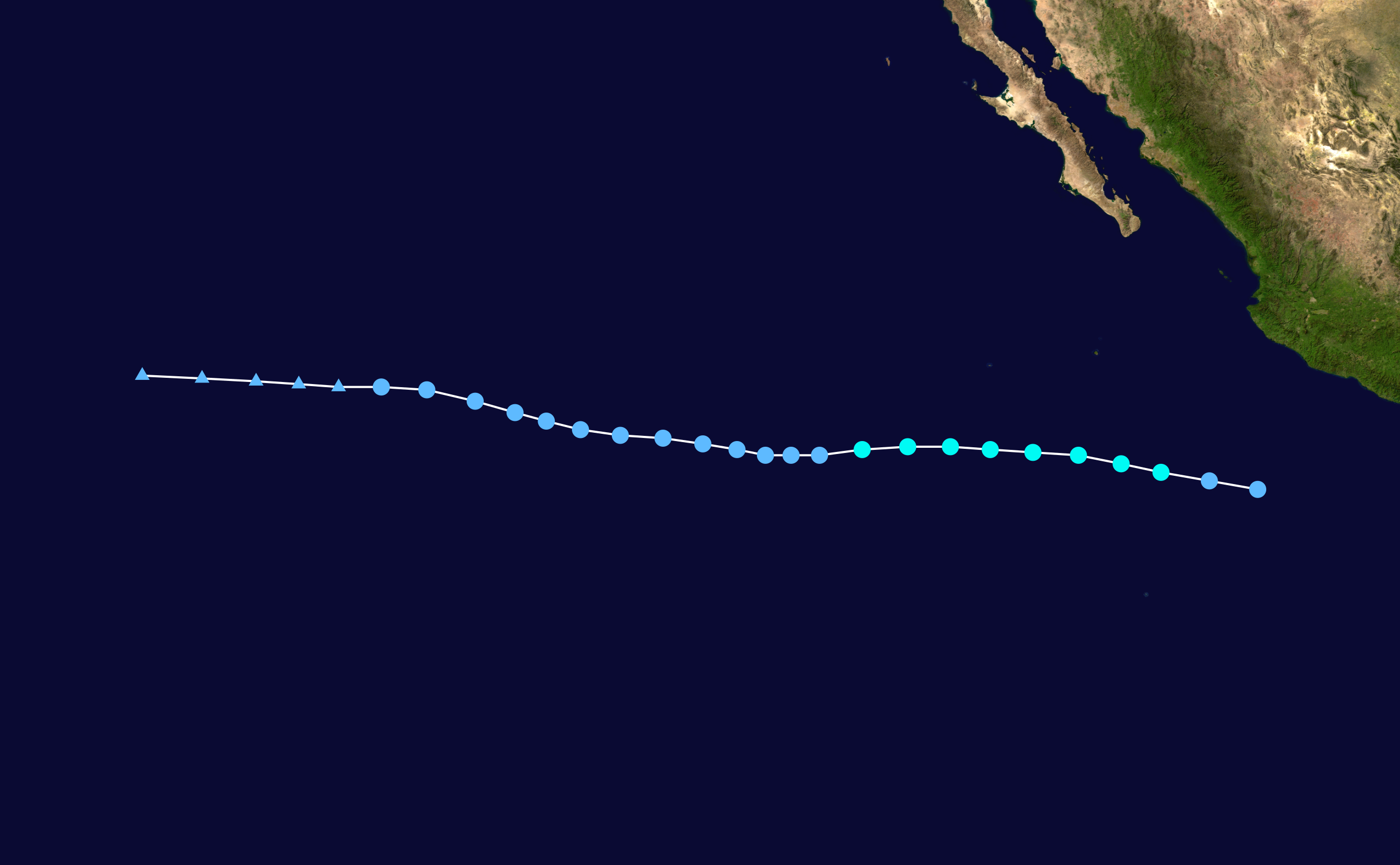
- Duration: July 17 – July 23
- Peak intensity: 50 mph (85 km/h) (1-min); 1000 mbar (hPa)

A tropical wave passed over Central America on July 12 and began to show signs of organization south of the Gulf of Tehuantepec two days later, prompting Dvorak classifications on the system. As it continued to develop, the NHC designated the system a tropical depression at 18:00 UTC on July 17 about 360 mi (580 km) south of Manzanillo. Tracking westward on the southern periphery of a ridge, the depression became Tropical Storm Felicia twelve hours later, and forecasters anticipated further strengthening into a minimal hurricane. However, the storm remained disorganized and peaked with 50 mph (80 km/h) winds late on July 18. The storm gradually weakened under increasing shear as it headed west, weakening back to a tropical depression on July 20 and degenerating to a remnant low around 12:00 UTC on July 23. After a west-northwestward turn, the remnant low entered the Central Pacific, where it dissipated well east of Hawaii on July 24. Felicia did not impact land.

=== Tropical Storm Guillermo ===
- Tropical storm (SSHWS)
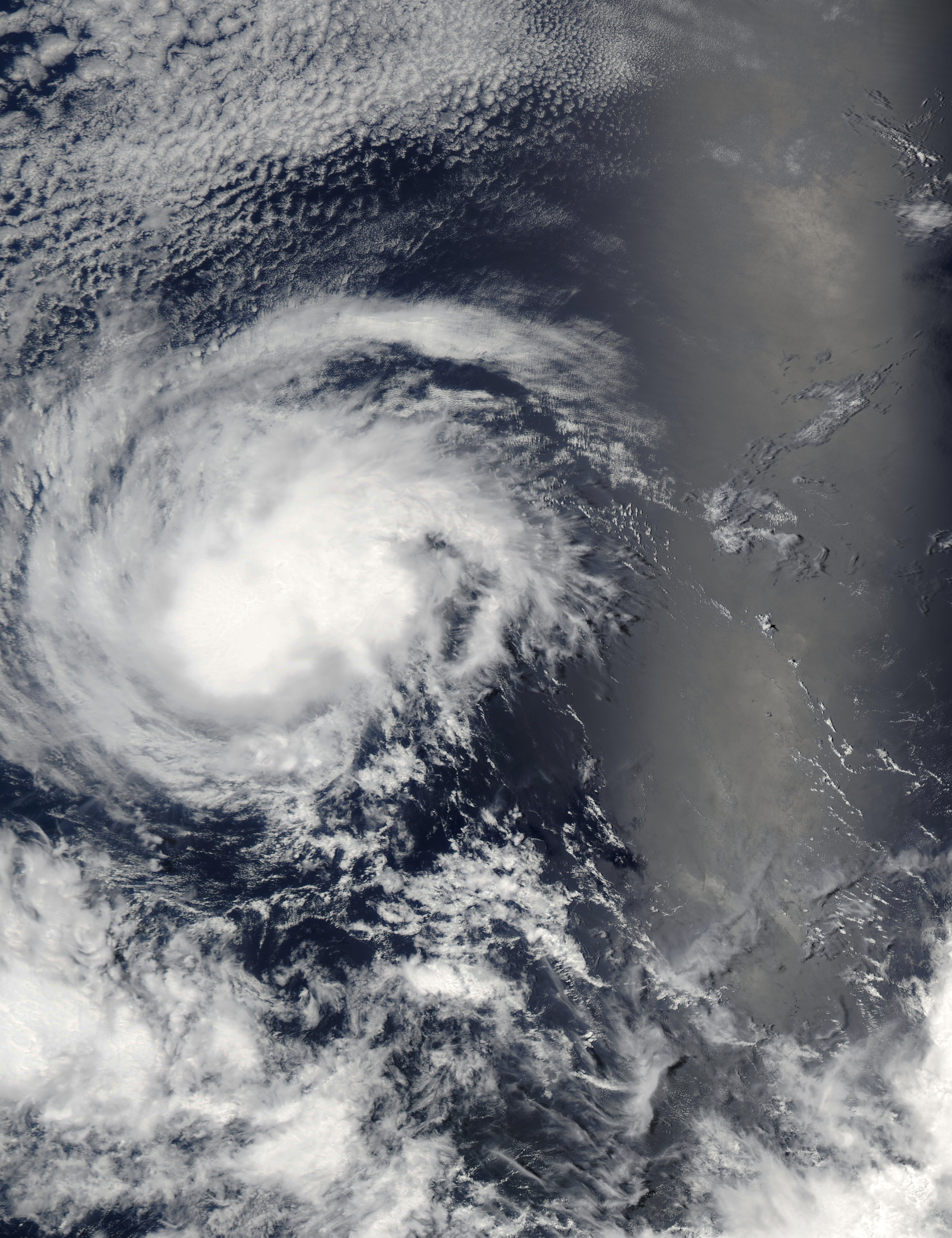
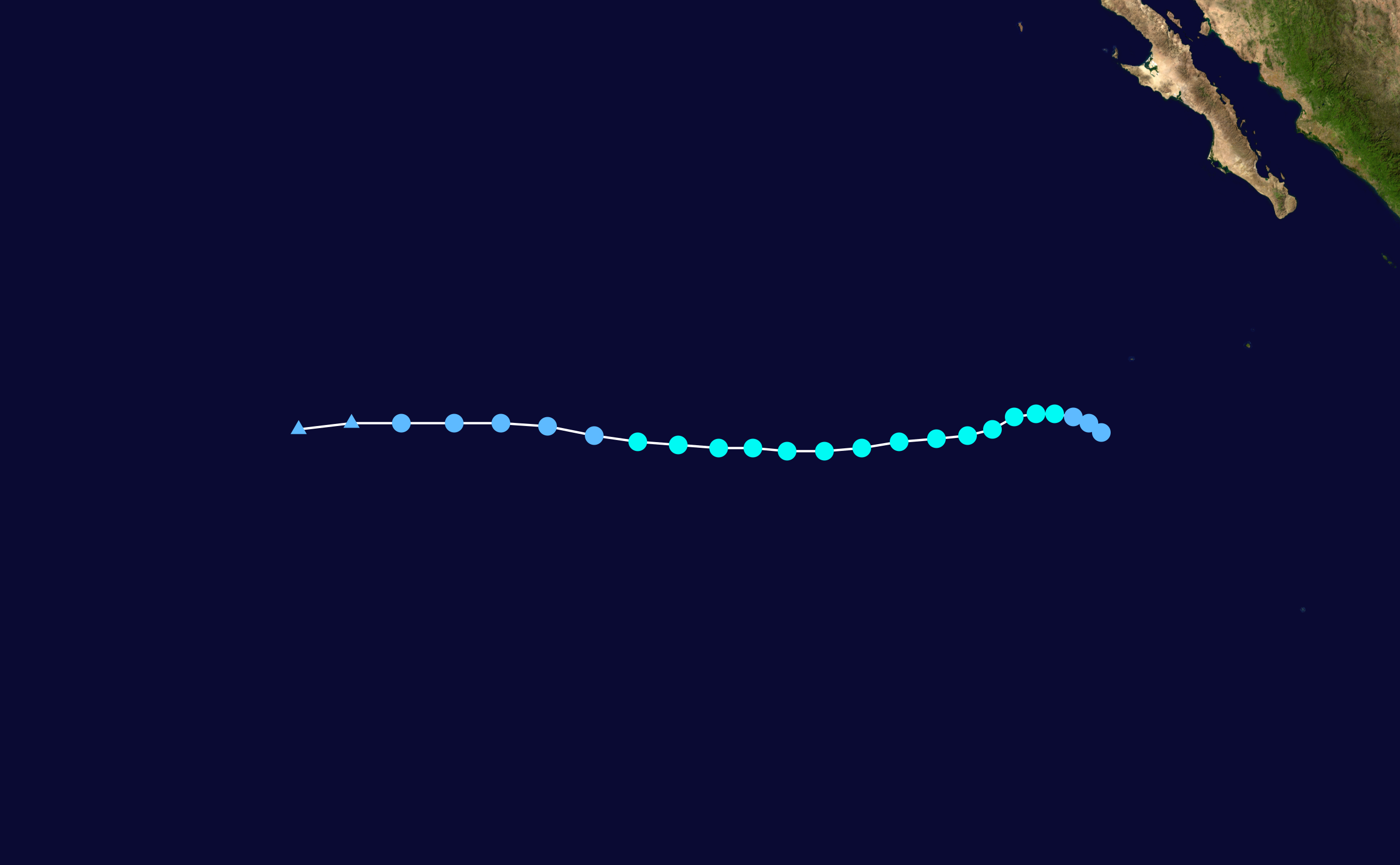
- Duration: August 7 – August 12
- Peak intensity: 60 mph (95 km/h) (1-min); 997 mbar (hPa)

A tropical wave entered the eastern north Pacific Ocean on August 1 and began to show signs of organization three days later, including the development of convection and the formation of a surface low. It acquired sufficient organization to be deemed a tropical depression by 06:00 UTC on August 7 roughly 605 mi (975 km) southwest of Cabo San Lucas. Although the system was forecast to remain under tropical storm intensity and ultimately dissipate, it became more organized as it moved to the west. At 00:00 UTC on August 8, the depression was upgraded to Tropical Storm Guillermo. Later that day, Guillermo reached its peak strength with 60 mph (97 km/h) winds. It maintained this strength for a full day, until outflow from the developing Tropical Storm Hilda about 690 mi (1,110 km) to its east disrupted its convection. Guillermo weakened into a tropical depression on August 11, and it became further disheveled as wind shear increased from the west. Associated deep convection collapsed on August 12, and Guillermo degenerated to a remnant low around 18:00 UTC. The remnant low entered the Central Pacific and interacted with another weak low-level circulation that would later become Tropical Depression One-C prior to dissipation on August 13.

=== Tropical Storm Hilda ===
- Tropical storm (SSHWS)
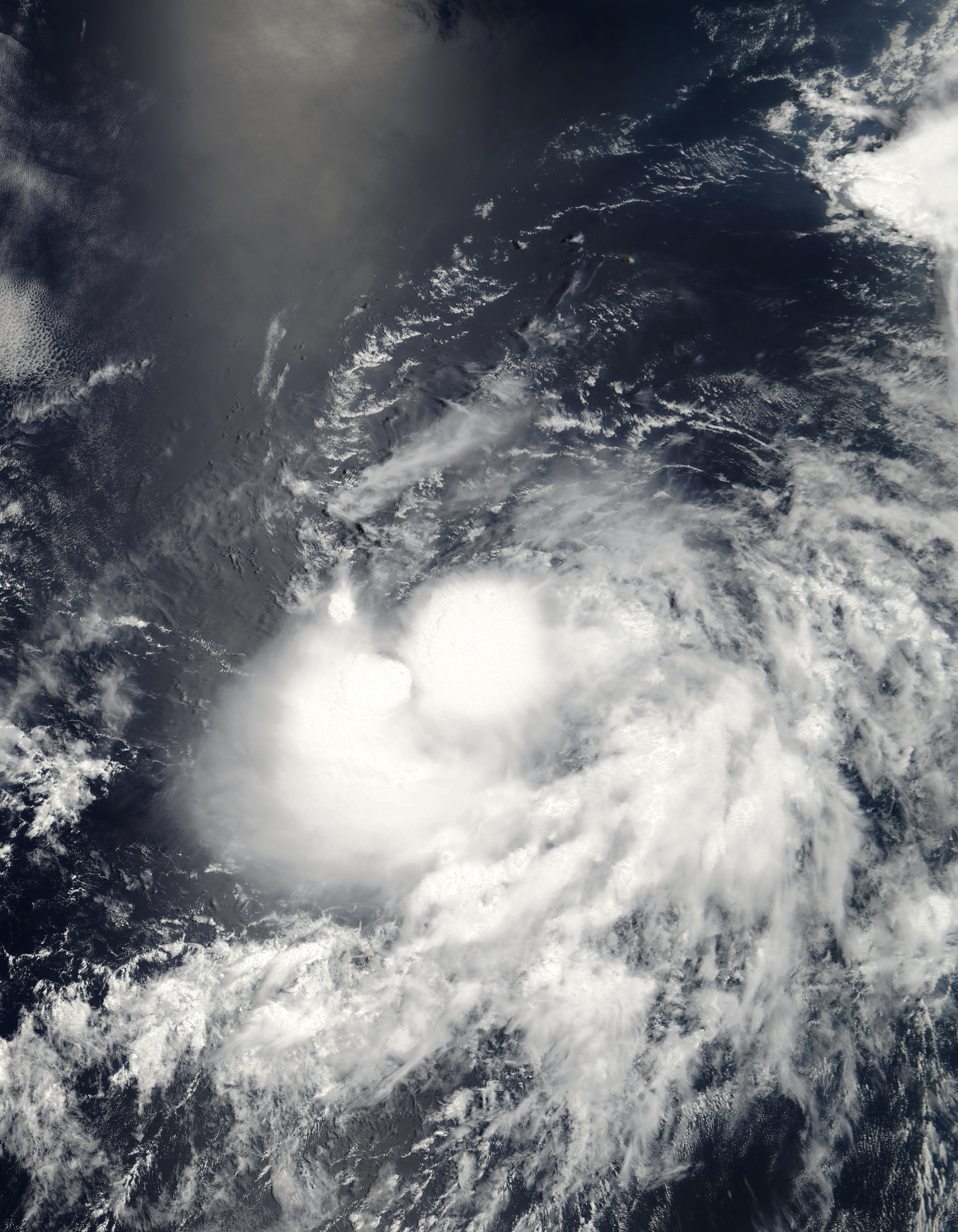
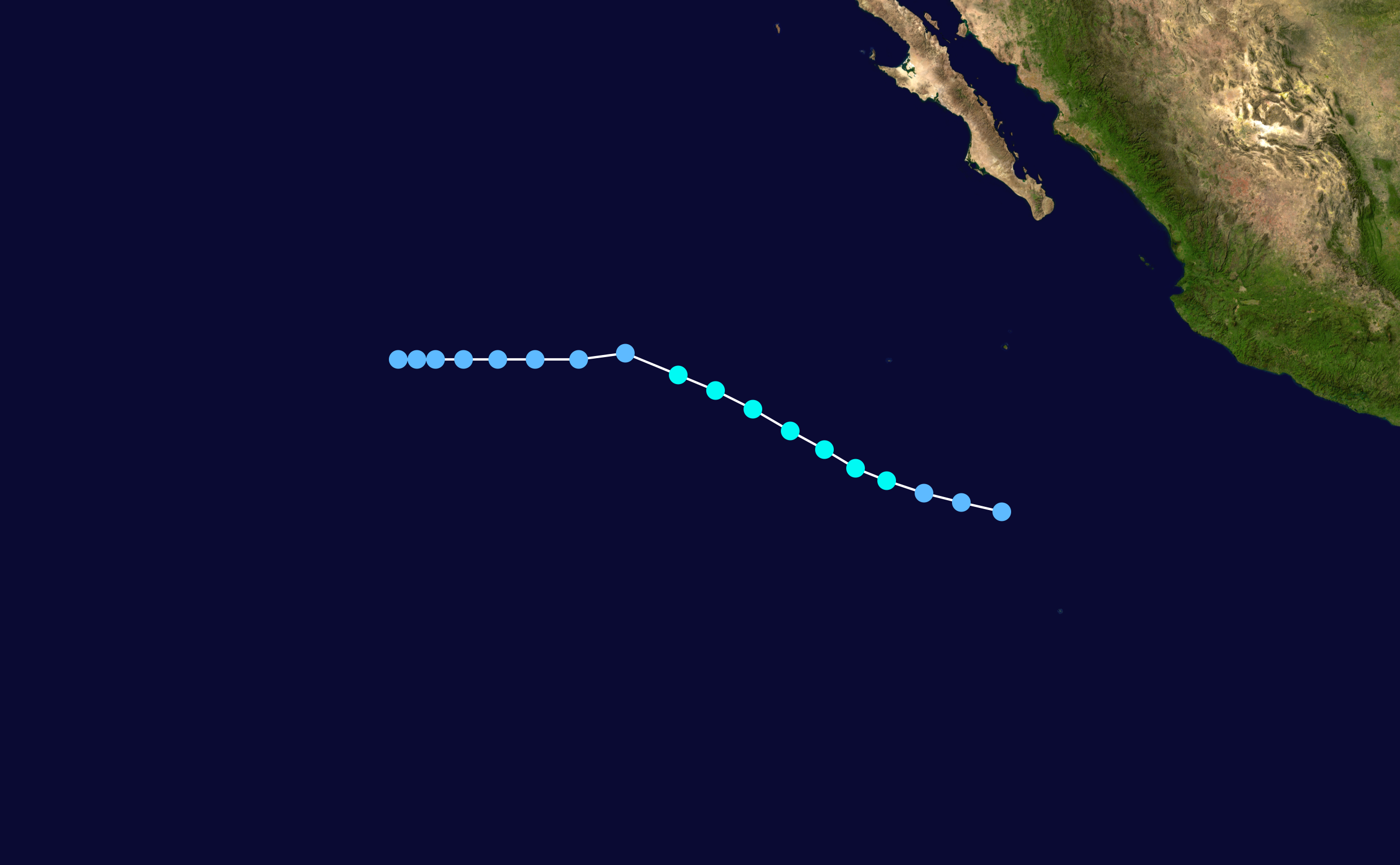
- Duration: August 9 – August 13
- Peak intensity: 40 mph (65 km/h) (1-min); 1004 mbar (hPa)

On August 5, a tropical wave south of the Gulf of Tehuantepec began to produce persistent thunderstorm activity. The resultant disturbance moved west and developed into Tropical Depression Eight-E approximately 690 mi (1,110 km) to the south of Cabo San Lucas around 06:00 UTC on August 9. Owing to the system's impressive outflow across its western quadrant, forecasters predicted additional intensification to hurricane strength. The depression became Tropical Storm Hilda around 00:00 UTC on August 10, but it failed to intensify beyond winds of 40 mph (64 km/h) as easterly wind shear increased. Hilda moved west-northwest initially, but increasingly cooler waters weakened the cyclone, and low-level flow across the East Pacific turned the storm west. It dissipated on August 13 having never approached land.

=== Tropical Depression One-C ===
- Tropical depression (SSHWS)
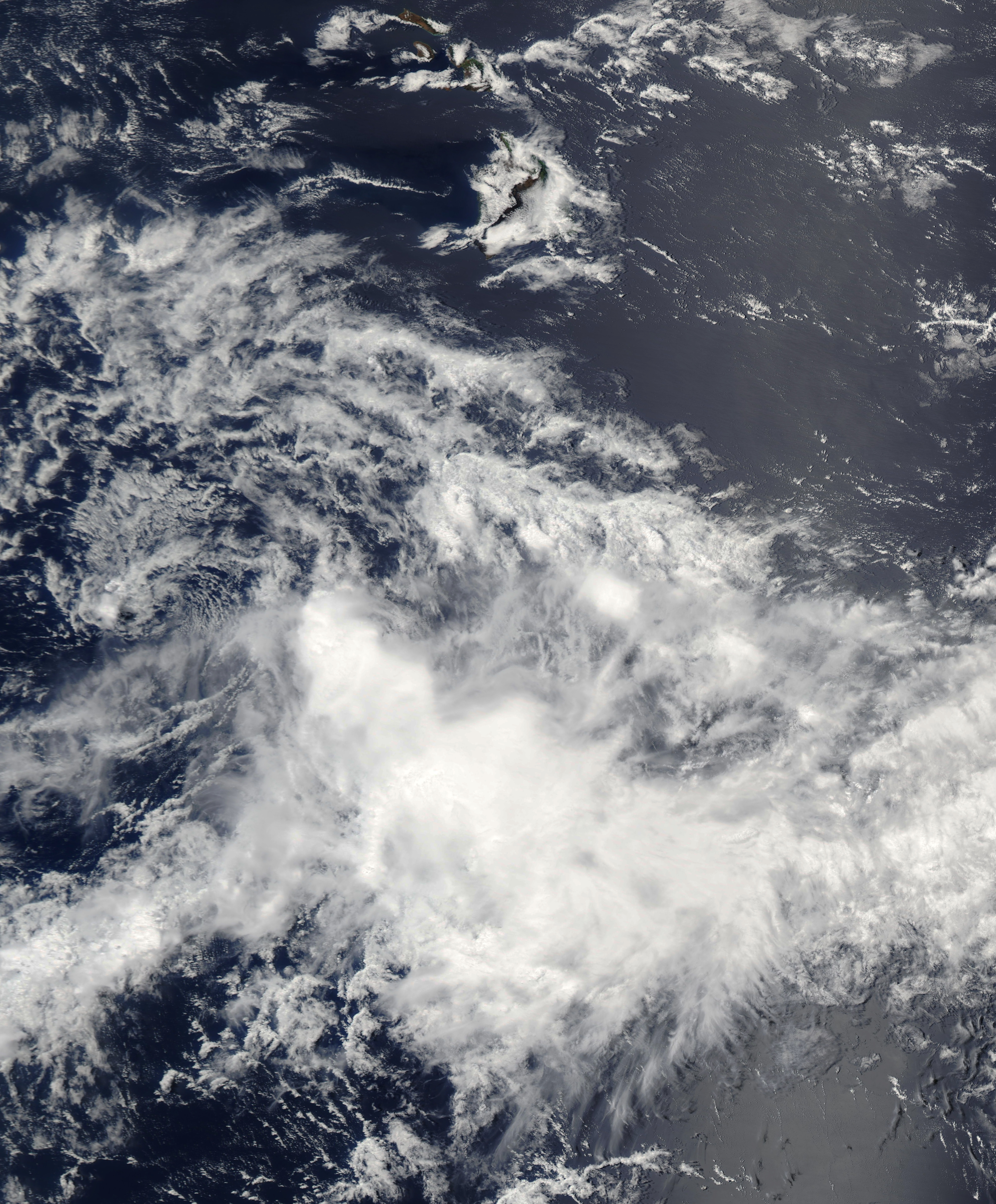
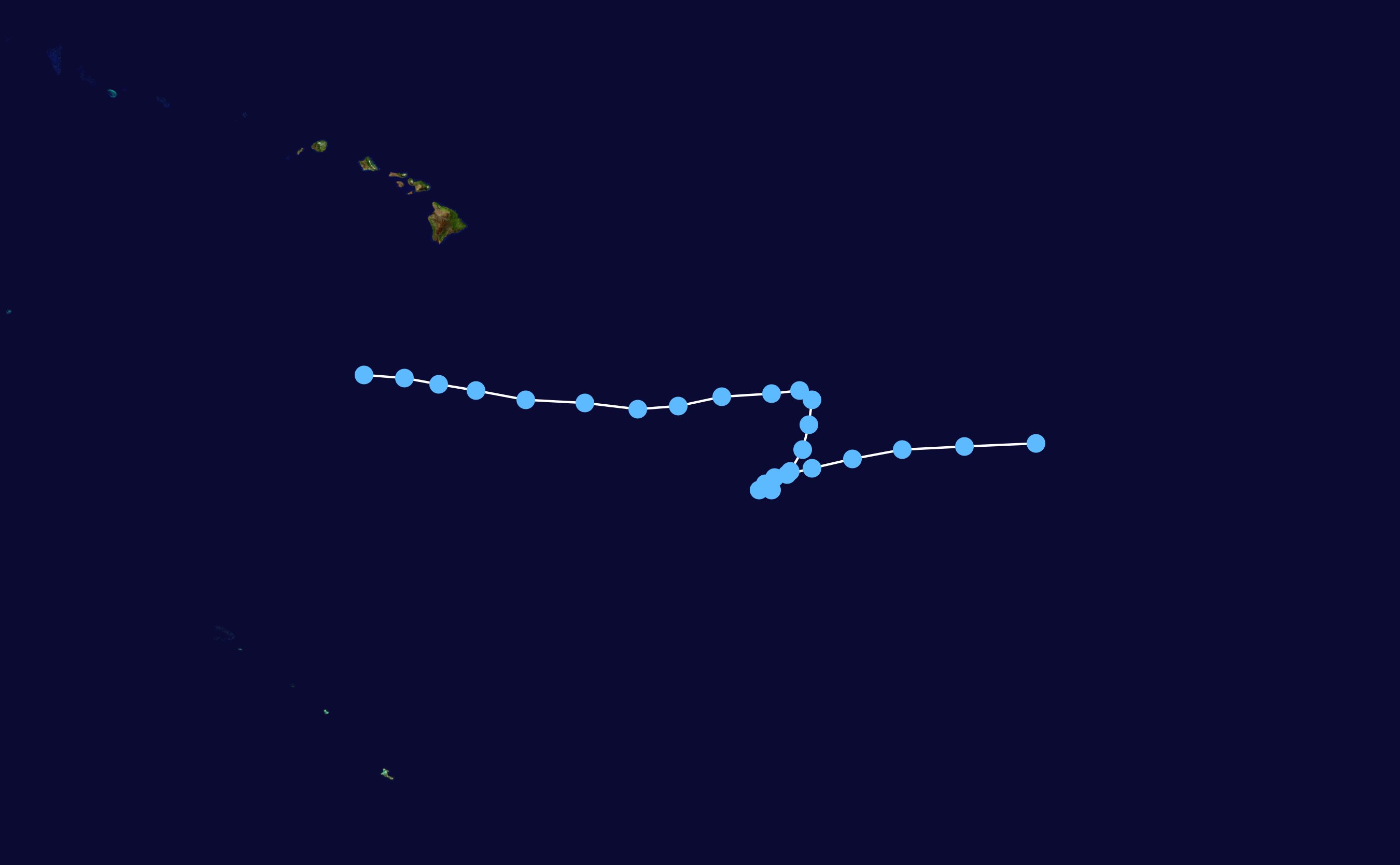
- Duration: August 15 – August 17
- Peak intensity: 35 mph (55 km/h) (1-min); 1009 mbar (hPa)

In mid-August, an area of active weather formed within the monsoon trough southeast of the Hawaiian Islands. At 18:00 UTC on August 15, this disturbance organized into Tropical Depression One-C. The incipient cyclone moved west and faced strong wind shear owing to a large upper-level trough to its northeast. Thus, One-C did not attain winds greater than 35 mph (56 km/h), and it instead degenerated to a remnant low around 00:00 UTC on August 17 after losing its associated convection. The system remained south of both the Hawaiian Islands and Johnston Atoll and eventually crossed into the West Pacific basin on August 20.

=== Hurricane Ignacio ===
- Category 2 hurricane (SSHWS)
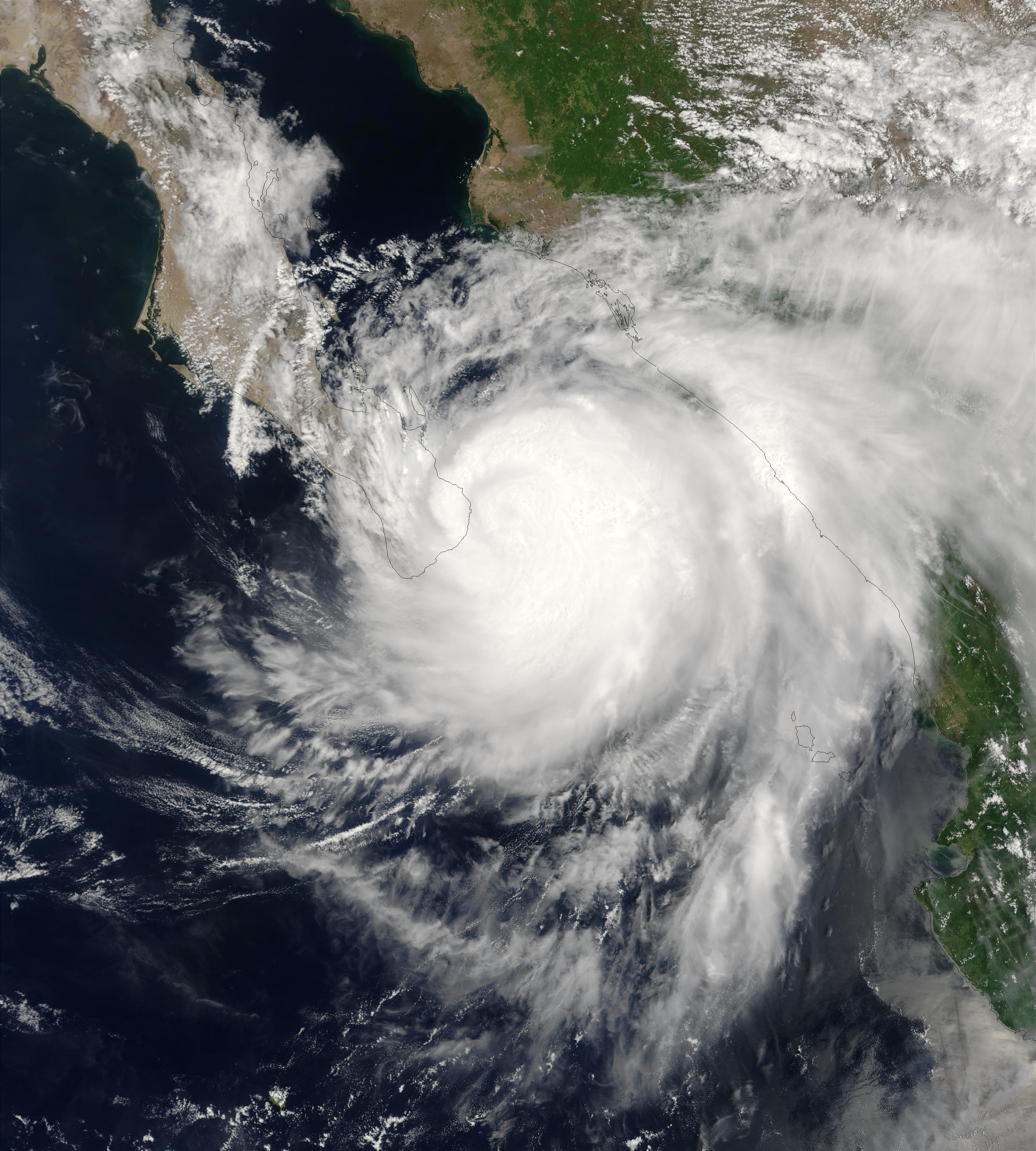
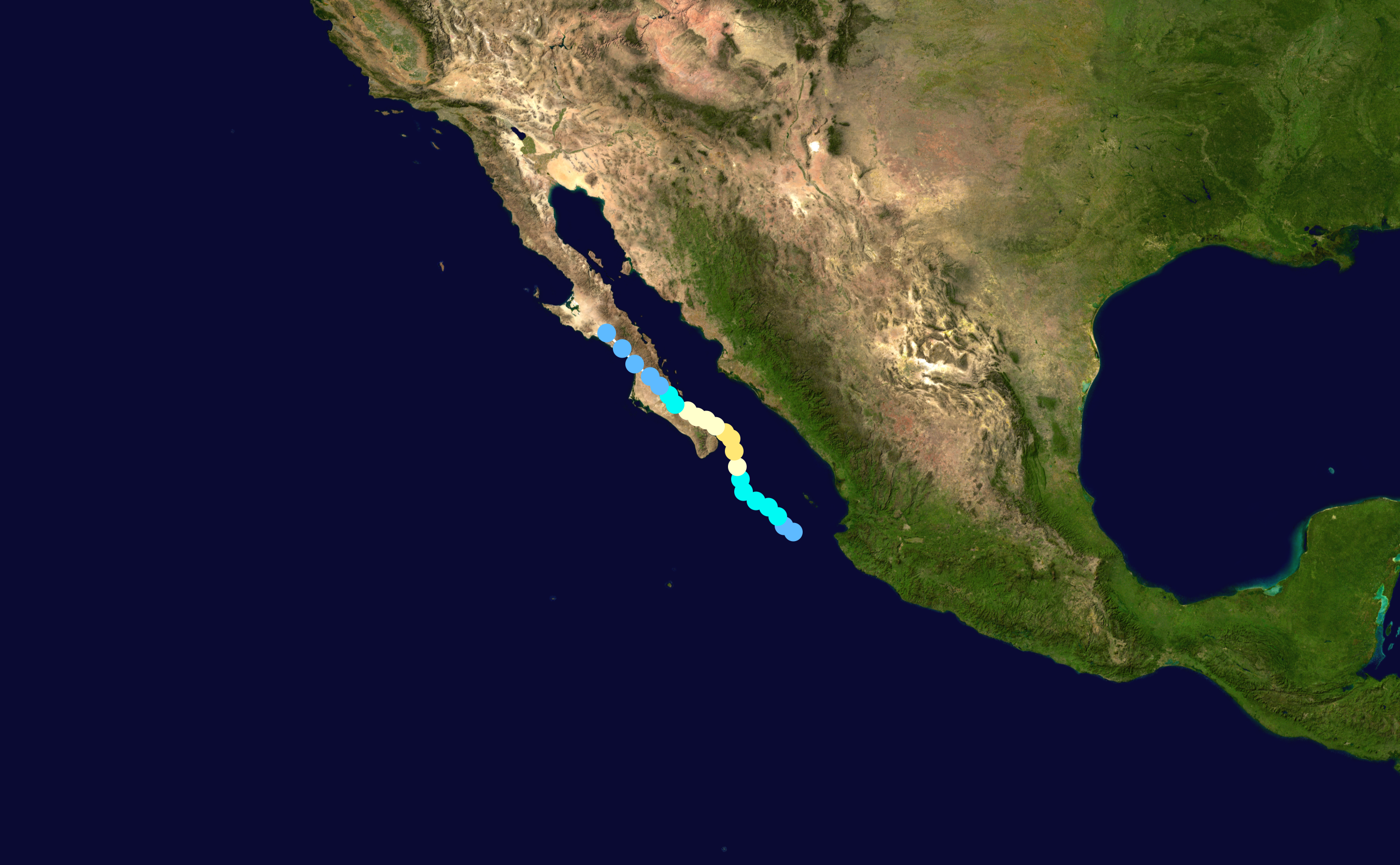
- Duration: August 22 – August 27
- Peak intensity: 105 mph (165 km/h) (1-min); 970 mbar (hPa)

A tropical wave spawned a distinct area of disturbed weather just south of Manzanillo on August 20. It moved northwest and became Tropical Depression Nine-E off Cabo Corrientes by 12:00 UTC on August 22 while it was located about 220 mi (350 km) southeast of Baja California Sur. Under the influence of favorable atmospheric conditions, the cyclone steadily strengthened and obtained tropical storm status on August 23. Early on August 24, Ignacio attained hurricane strength, marking the latest formation of the first hurricane of a season recorded in the East Pacific since reliable satellite observation began in 1966. Ignacio reached its peak intensity on August 26 as a Category 2 hurricane with winds of 105 mph (169 km/h). The storm tracked northwest across the southern Gulf of California and began to weaken due to land interaction, ultimately making landfall with winds of 80 mph (130 km/h) just to the east of La Paz. Ignacio weakened once inland and dissipated early on August 28 over central Baja California.

The slow motion of Ignacio produced heavy rainfall across the southern portion of the Baja California peninsula, including a peak 24‑hour total of 7.25 in (184 mm) in Ciudad Constitución, which was beneficial in ending an ongoing drought but resulted in severe flooding. The passage of the hurricane left citizens in Todos Santos without power for around 24 hours. It forced the closure of roads and airports in La Paz. Overall, Ignacio was responsible for approximately US$21 million in damage. Four people were killed by the storm, including two rescue workers that drowned in the flood waters brought by the storm, and some 10,000 people were evacuated to shelters. Six municipalities in Baja California Sur were declared disaster areas. The remnants of Ignacio produced thunderstorm activity in high terrain areas of central California, resulting in 3,500 customers losing power, over 300 lightning strikes, and 14 forest fires.

=== Hurricane Jimena ===
- Category 2 hurricane (SSHWS)
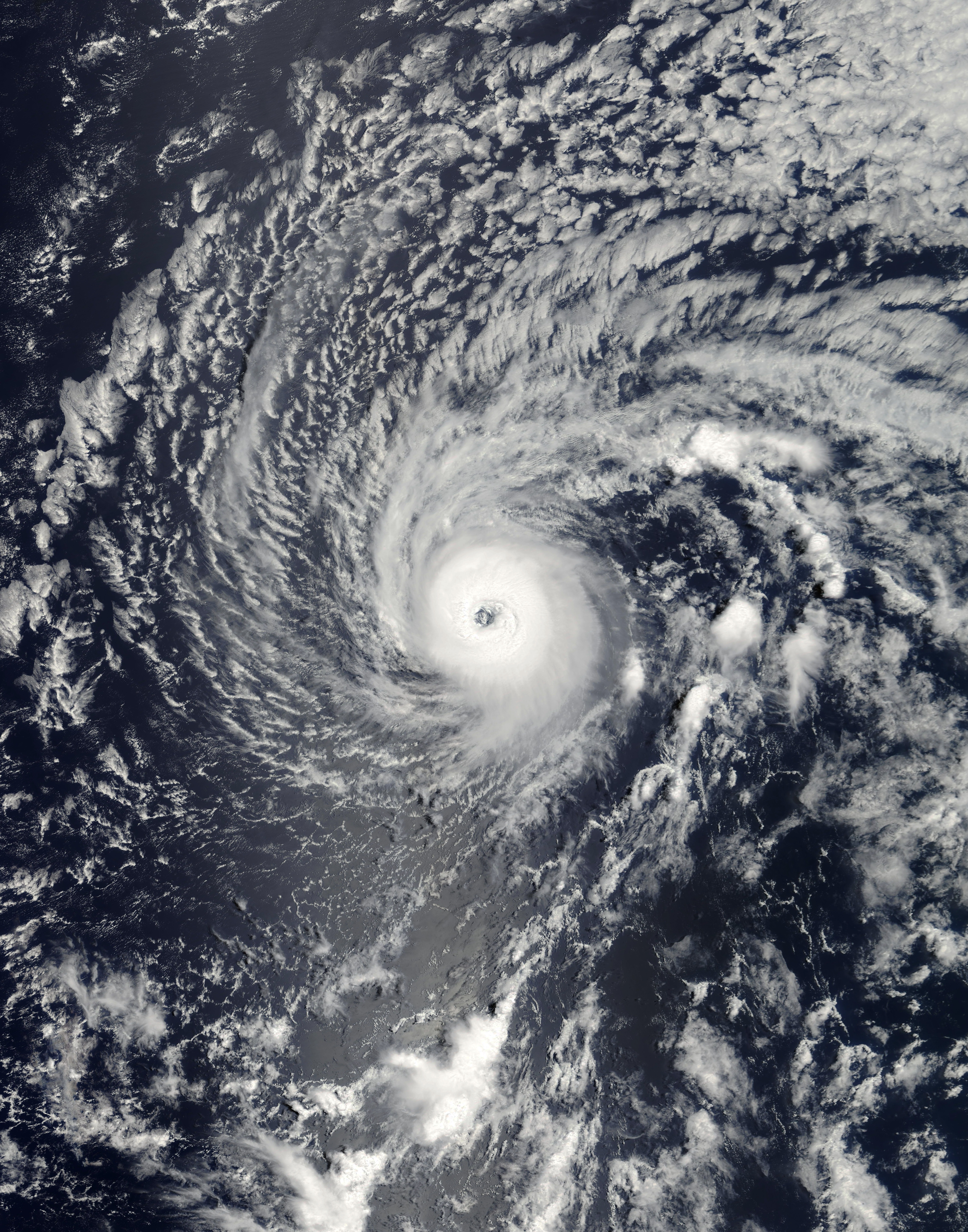
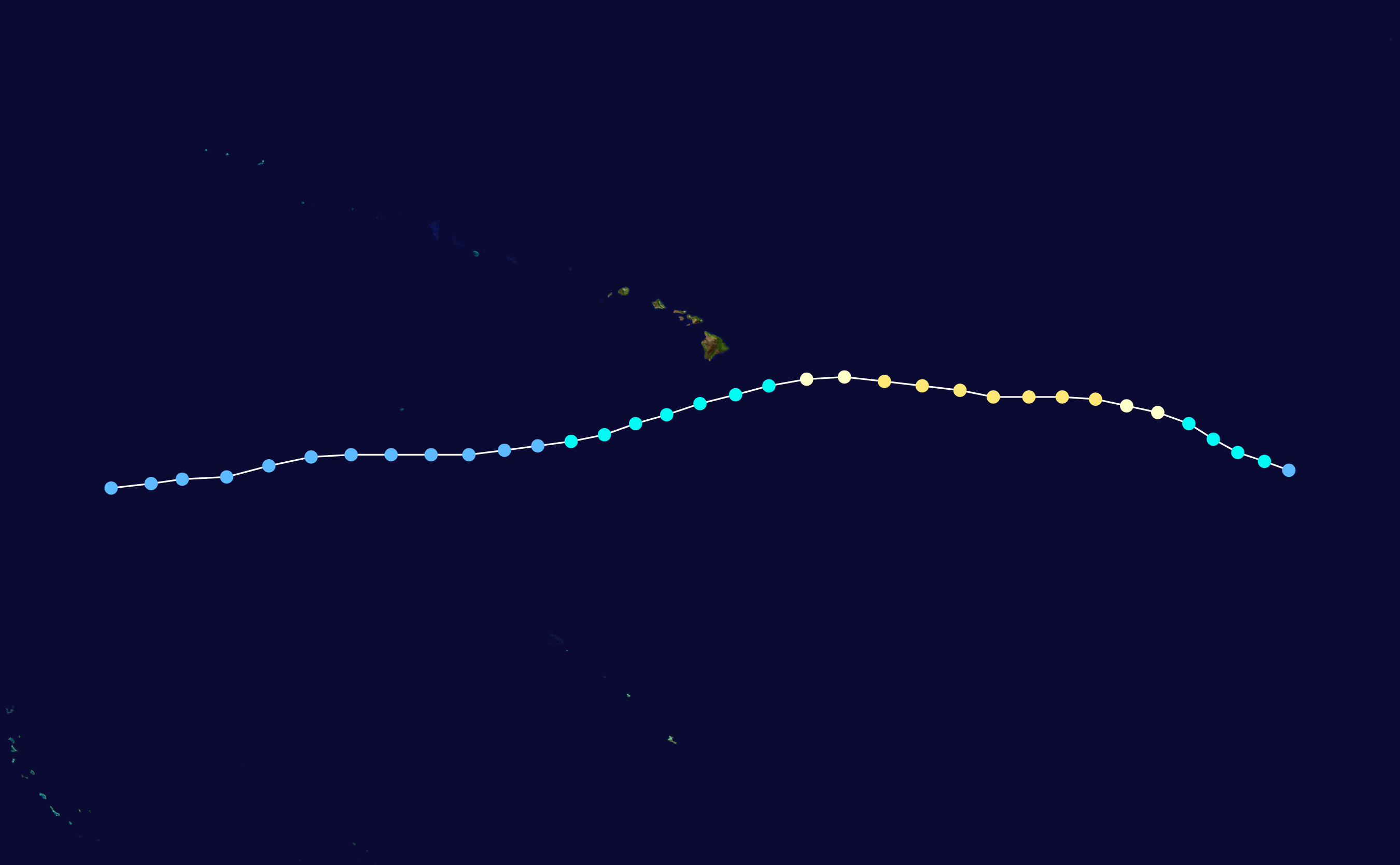
- Duration: August 28 – September 5
- Peak intensity: 105 mph (165 km/h) (1-min); 970 mbar (hPa)

An area of disturbed weather formed on August 26, 2003, and drifted westward. At 06:00 UTC on August 28, an area of disturbed weather within the Intertropical Convergence Zone developed into Tropical Depression Ten-E some 1,725 miles (2,776 km) east of the Hawaiian Islands. The storm began to steadily intensify as it tracked over warm ocean waters, attaining tropical storm status six hours later. Jimena continued to intensify as it moved westward. On August 29, satellite imagery showed a well defined eye developing, and that day, Jimena attained hurricane status. As the hurricane neared the Central Pacific Basin, it winds reached a peak intensity of 105 mph (169 km/h) and its barometric pressure fell to 970 millibars on August 30. Later that day, Jimena crossed into the central Pacific, where it began weakening due to increased wind shear. On September 1, it fell to tropical storm status. That day, the storm passed about 120 mi (190 km) to the south of the southern tip of Big Island. Further weakening brought the cyclone back to tropical depression intensity on September 3. It crossed the International Date Line on September 5, becoming the first storm to exist in all three Pacific basins since 1999's Hurricane Dora. Later that day, the circulation dissipated about 715 mi (1,151 km) southeast of Wake Island.

The Central Pacific Hurricane Center issuing a Hurricane Watch and tropical storm warning for the Big Island of Hawaii, and a flash flood watch was also issued. Officials closed beaches and canceled outdoor activities. The American Red Cross opened shelters and provided emergency services. As Jimena passed south of Hawaii as a weakening tropical storm, it brought high winds and heavy rainfall to the island. High wind gusts of 53–58 mph (85–93 km/h) were reported in South Point and Kahoolawe. In Honolulu, a weather station reported winds of 36 mph (58 km/h) while a station in Kauai reported winds of 22 mph (35 km/h). The storm dropped 6–10 inches of rain across the Big Island. In Glenwood, Hawaii, the storm dropped 8.43 inches (214 mm) of rain. The rainfall from Jimena helped reduce drought conditions across the Big Island. Coastal sections of the Hawaiian Islands reported high surf ranging from 11 to 15 feet (3.4 to 4.6 meters) high. High winds from Jimena knocked down trees and damaged power lines, leaving 1,300 residents without electricity. Heavy rainfall from the storm also caused minor flooding on the eastern side of the Big Island. Offshore, high surf and strong currents brought by the storm resulted in 350 swimmers being rescued by the United States Coast Guard, residents, and state and local police and fire departments.

=== Tropical Storm Kevin ===
- Tropical storm (SSHWS)
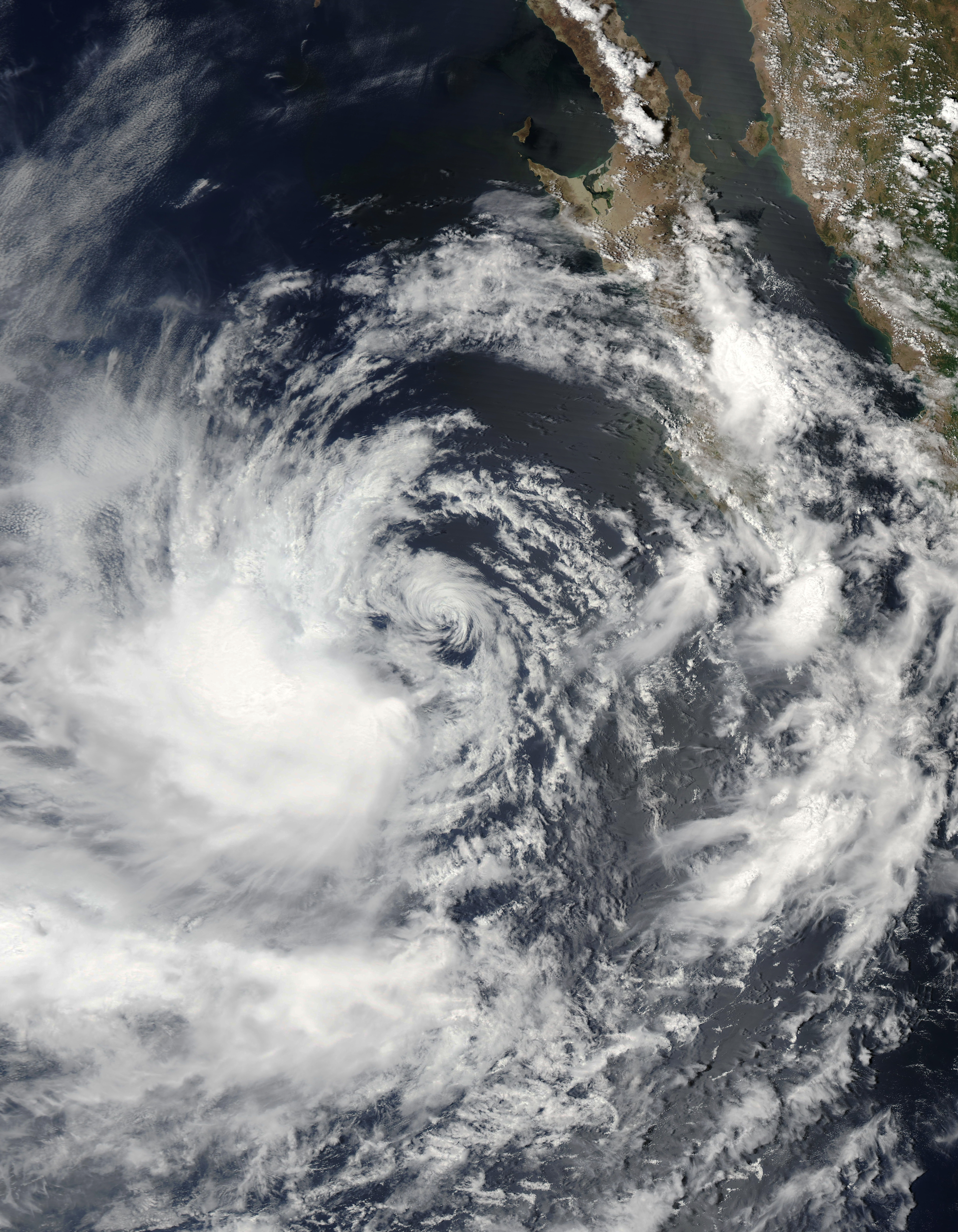
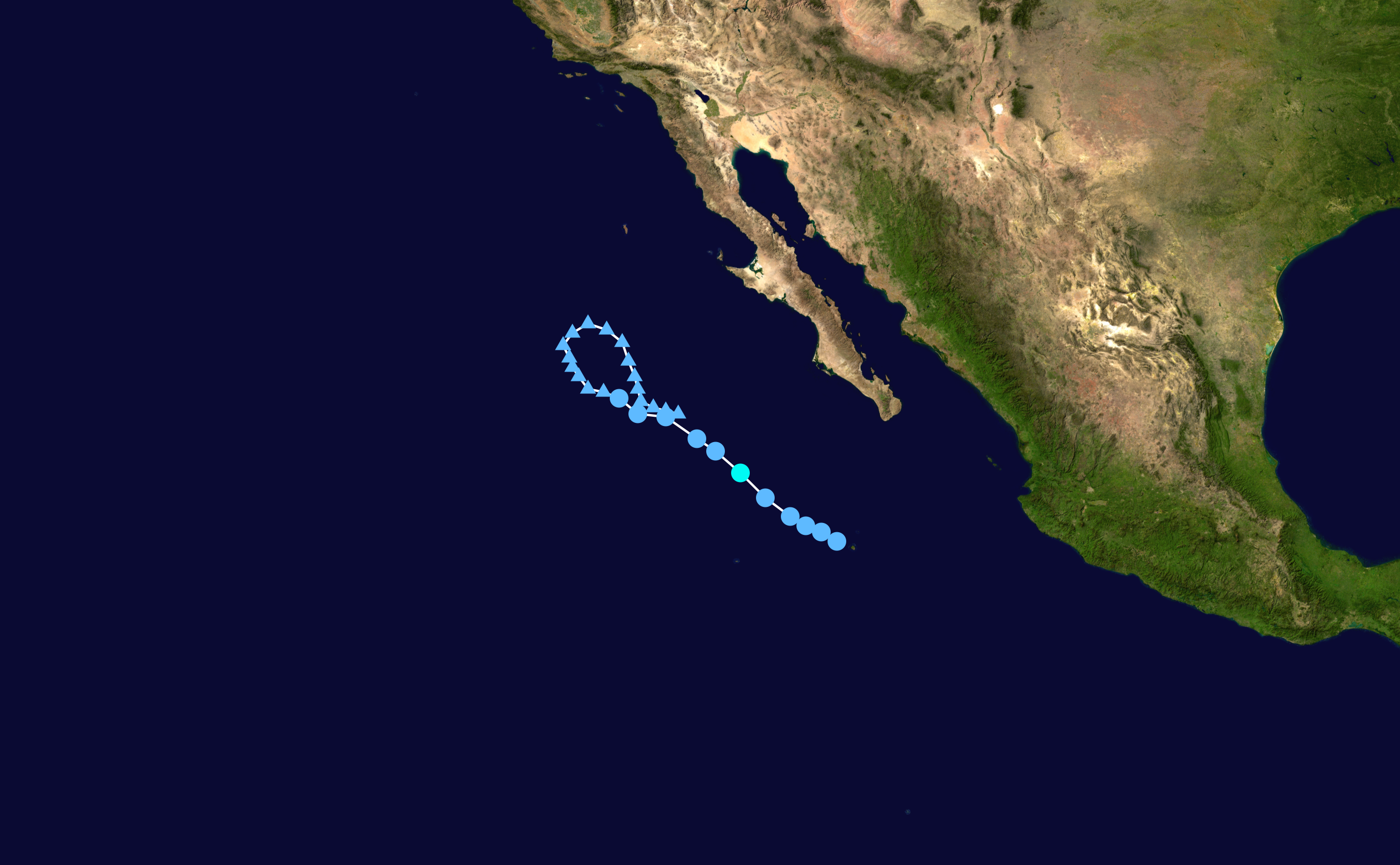
- Duration: September 3 – September 6
- Peak intensity: 40 mph (65 km/h) (1-min); 1000 mbar (hPa)

A tropical wave entered the East Pacific on August 21 but remained devoid of any convective activity until August 28. A broad surface low developed on August 29 but its associated convective activity remained poorly organized. Tracking west-northwest around the western periphery of a ridge over Mexico, the disturbance began receiving Dvorak classifications on September 3. By 12:00 UTC that day, an increase in organization prompted the designation of Tropical Depression Eleven-E roughly 280 mi (450 km) south-southwest of the tip of Baja California. After formation, the system was inhibited by its broad circulation and its positioning near cooler waters. Nevertheless, the depression reached tropical storm strength on September 4, and Kevin attained peak winds of 40 mph (64 km/h) then. This peak intensity lasted for just six hours as the cyclone weakened back to a tropical depression. At 06:00 UTC on September 6, the system degenerated to a remnant low, which persisted for four days before dissipation. Tropical Storm Kevin did not impact land.

=== Hurricane Linda ===
- Category 1 hurricane (SSHWS)
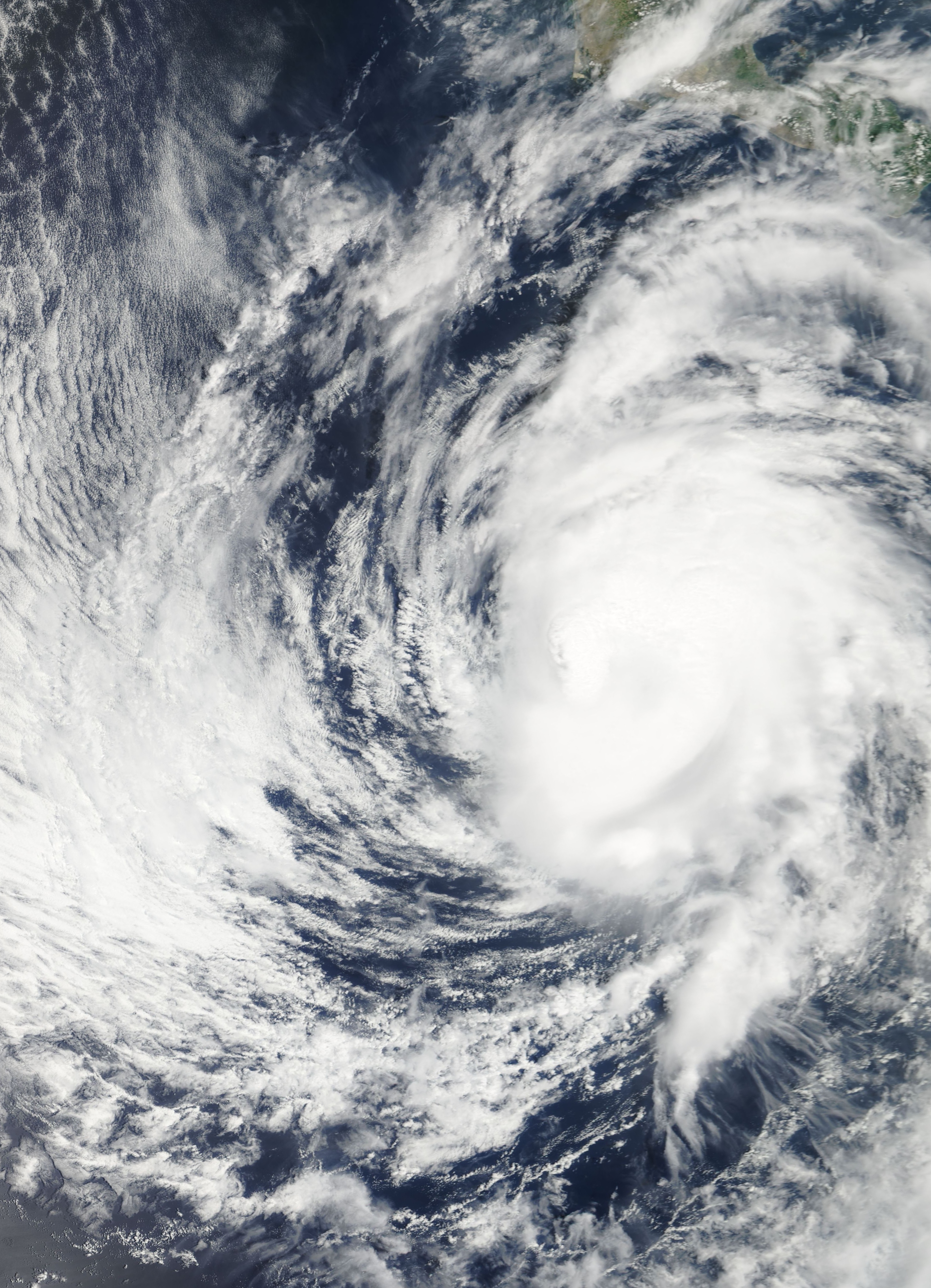
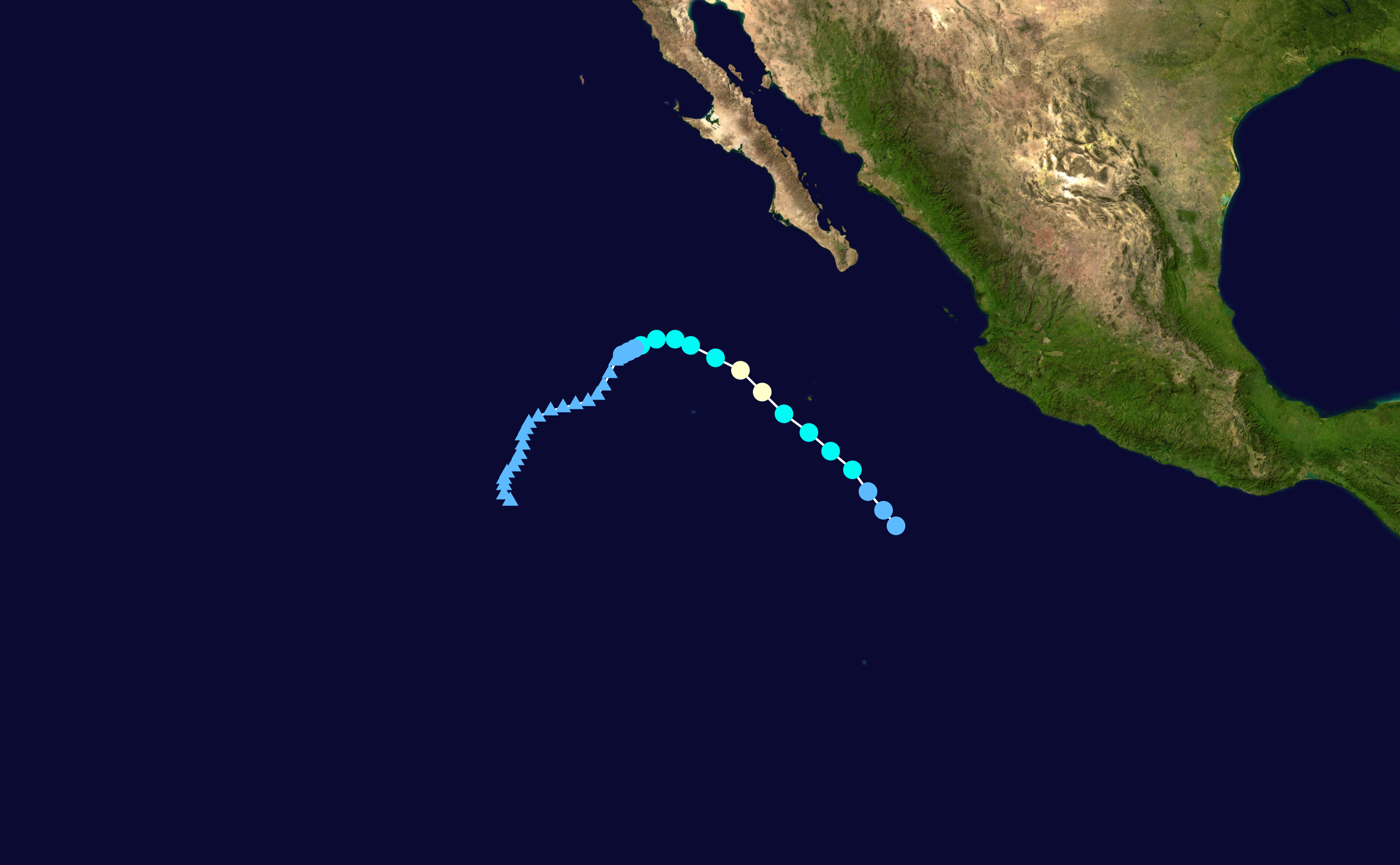
- Duration: September 13 – September 17
- Peak intensity: 75 mph (120 km/h) (1-min); 987 mbar (hPa)

A tropical wave entered the East Pacific on September 6. Convection began to increase along its axis on September 9; three days later, a broad surface low developed. Around 12:00 UTC on September 13, the disturbance organized into Tropical Depression Twelve-E about 390 mi (630 km) to the southwest of Manzanillo. The cyclone moved to the northwest and was classified as a tropical storm at 12:00 UTC on September 14. Linda steadily intensified as rainbands increased and outflow expanded. At 12:00 UTC on September 15, Linda was upgraded to a hurricane and reached its peak strength of 75 mph (121 km/h). After 12 hours at this intensity, the cyclone began to weaken, turning west and then southwest as it did so. Linda became a tropical depression on September 17 and degenerated to a remnant low around 00:00 UTC the next day. It persisted for a few days before dissipation on September 23. Linda did not affect land.

=== Hurricane Marty ===
- Category 2 hurricane (SSHWS)
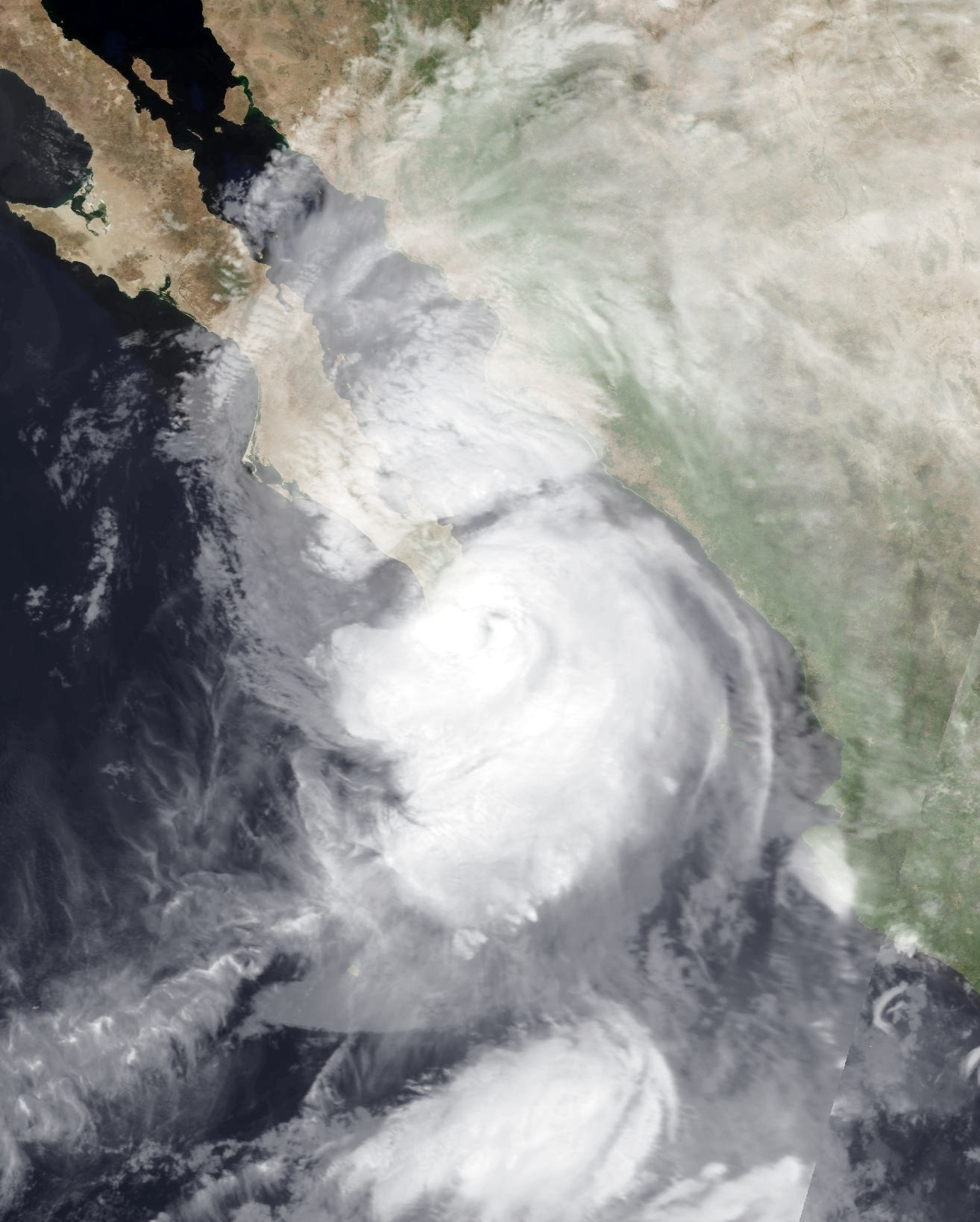
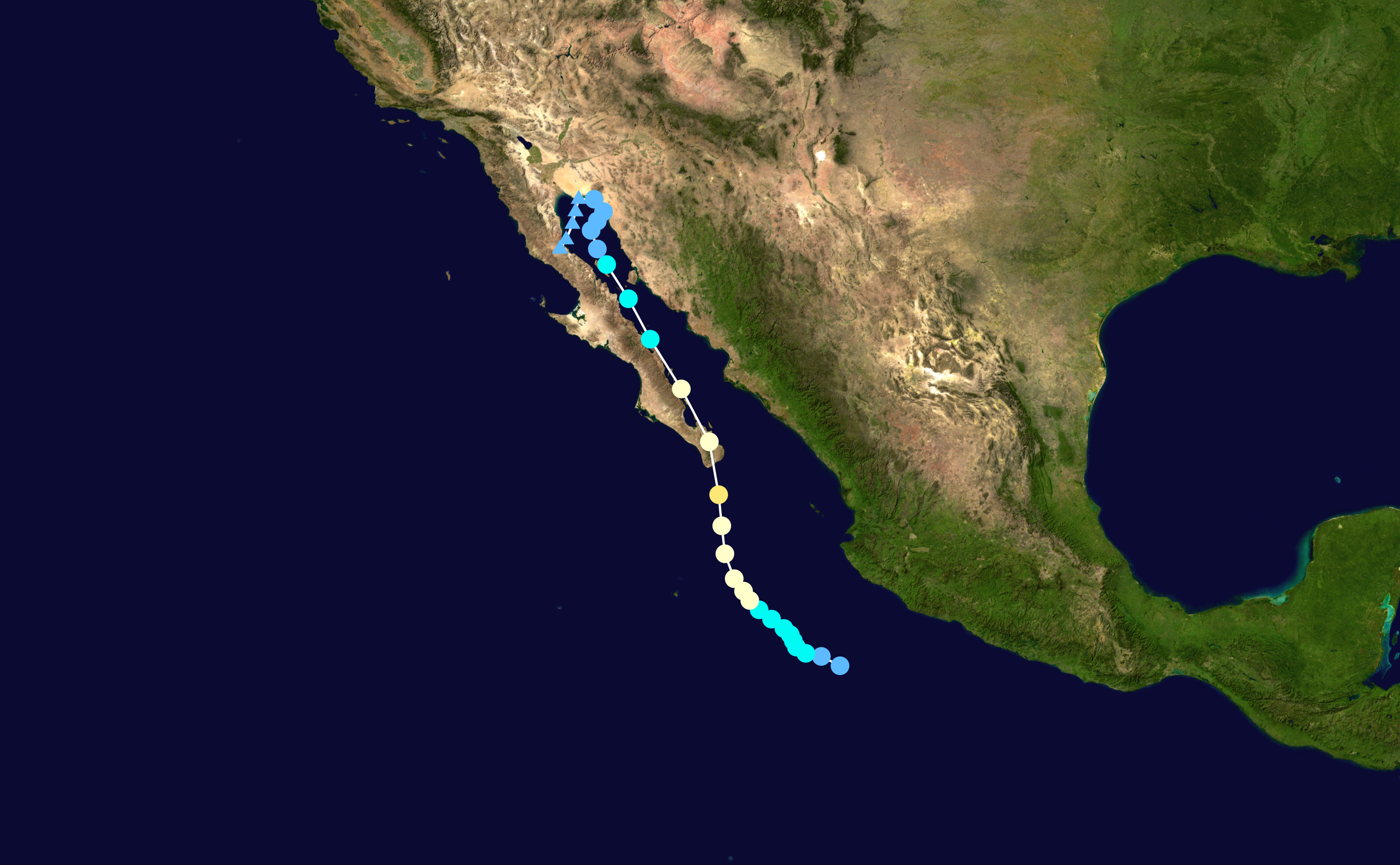
- Duration: September 18 – September 24
- Peak intensity: 100 mph (155 km/h) (1-min); 970 mbar (hPa)

A tropical wave moved into the East Pacific on September 10, and the convection associated with it gradually increased. At 18:00 UTC on September 18, while the system was positioned about 450 mi (720 km) south-southeast of Cabo San Lucas, it organized into Tropical Depression Thirteen-E. The depression strengthened as it headed toward the Baja California Peninsula, becoming a tropical storm after 12 hours and a hurricane around 00:00 UTC on September 21. High pressure to its west facilitated Marty's development, while favorable conditions allowed it to become a Category 2 hurricane with peak winds of 100 mph (160 km/h) early on September 22. Marty then moved northward at an increased speed before making landfall about 10 mi (16 km) northeast of Cabo San Lucas. After moving over the southern tip of the peninsula, Marty moved up the western coast of the Gulf of California, gradually weakening as it did so. The storm weakened to a tropical storm on September 23 and a tropical depression later that day. After making a second landfall near Puerto Peñasco as a tropical depression around 18:00 UTC on September 24, the system degenerated to a remnant low six hours later. Its remnants meandered over the northern Gulf of California prior to dissipating two days later.

Hurricane Marty was the deadliest storm of the 2003 Pacific hurricane season and was responsible for 12 deaths. A 5-foot (1.5 m) storm surge flooded parts of La Paz, and sank 35 yachts moored in various ports. Five people drowned after their cars were swept away by floodwaters while trying to cross a flooded stream. The floods also damaged about 4,000 homes. Two deaths also occurred when a tree fell on a car in Sinaloa. Overall, 6,000 people were affected and total damage from the storm was estimated at US$100 million, making Marty the costliest East Pacific storm of the year. The outer bands of the cyclone brought dropped locally heavy rains to extreme southwestern Arizona, but there were no reports of flooding.

=== Hurricane Nora ===
- Category 2 hurricane (SSHWS)
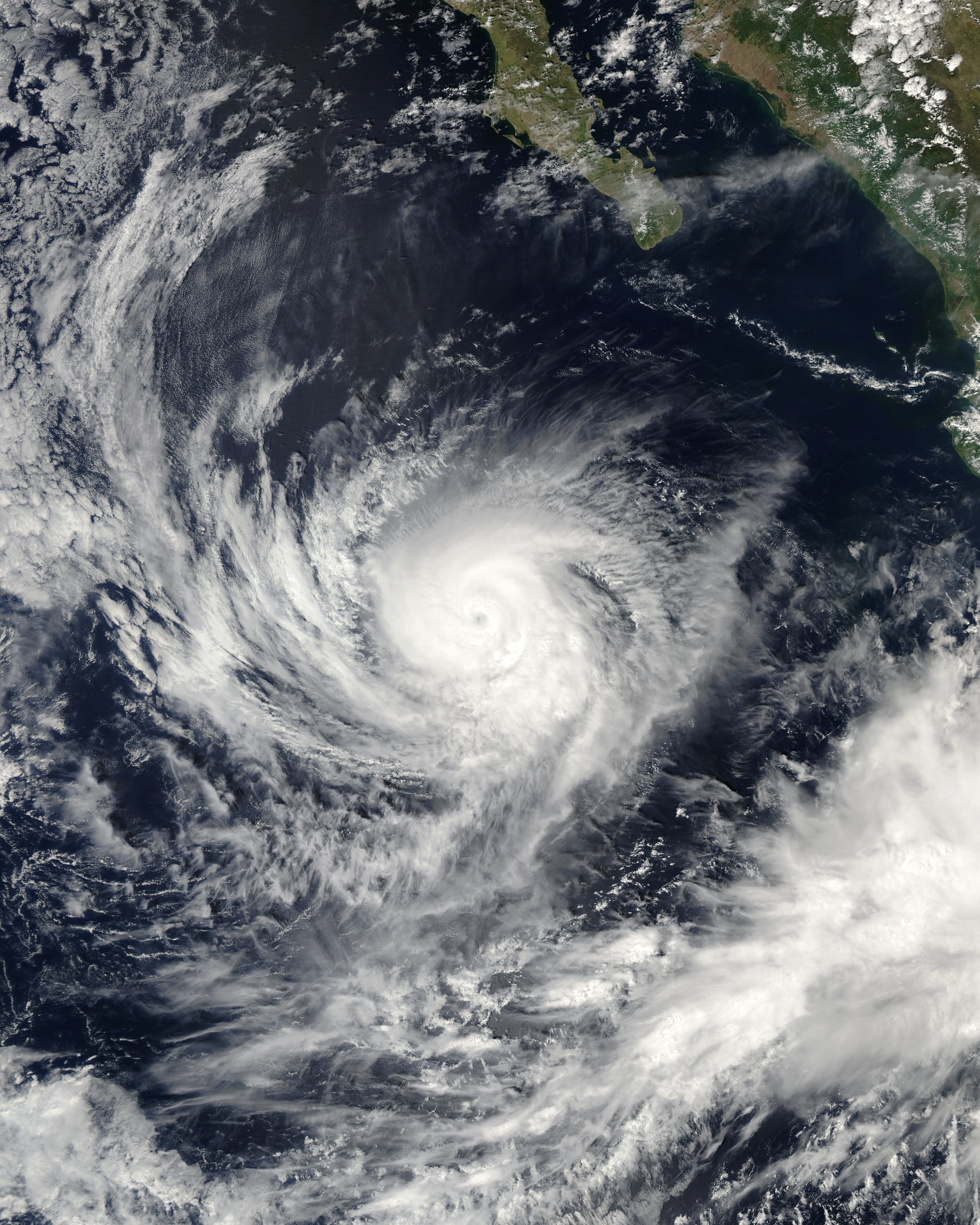
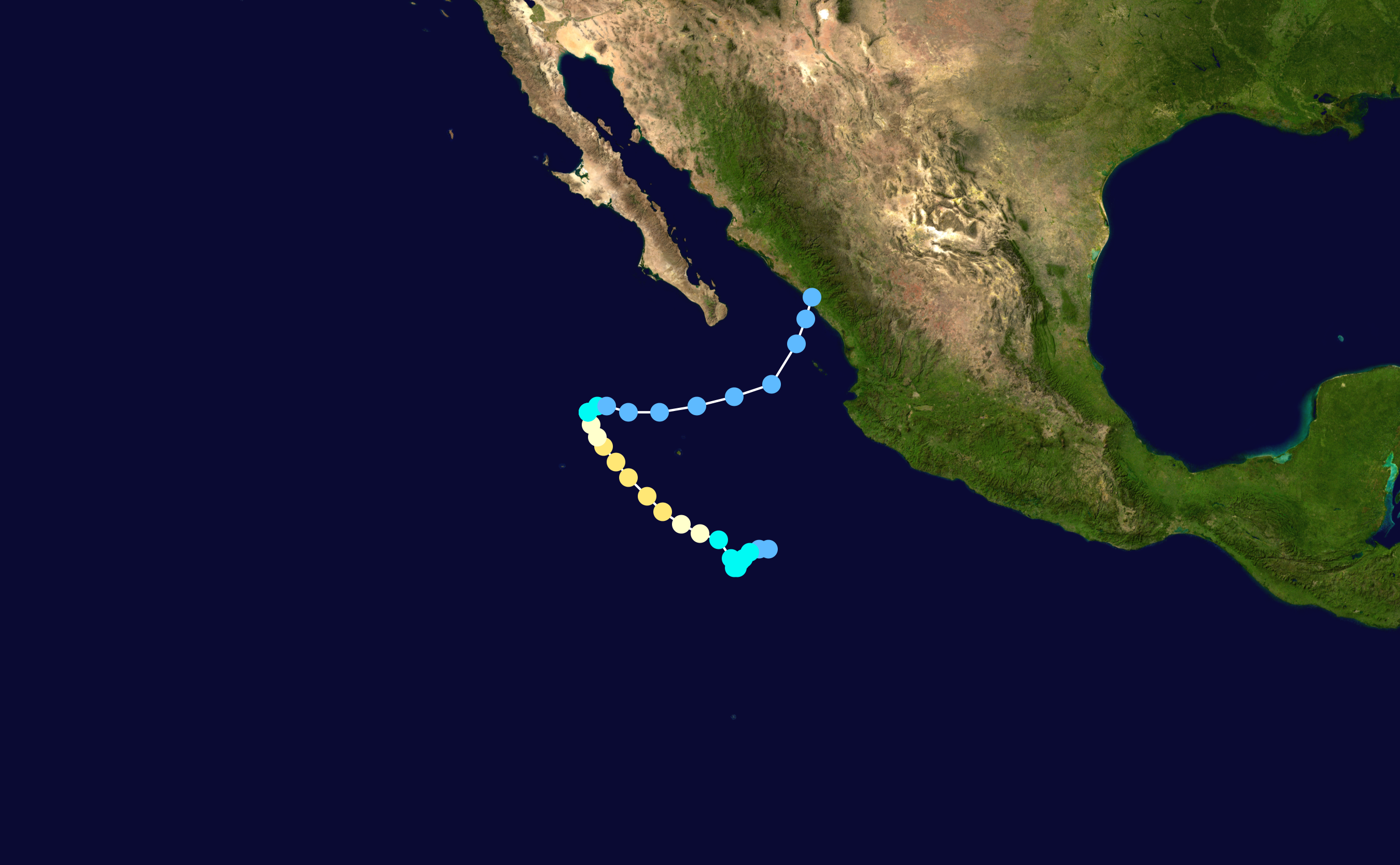
- Duration: October 1 – October 9
- Peak intensity: 105 mph (165 km/h) (1-min); 969 mbar (hPa)

A tropical wave exited western Africa on September 13, later emerging into the eastern Pacific twelve days later. Continuing westward, the system first showed signs of organization on September 29. On October 1, it developed into Tropical Depression 14E, located about 600 mi (975 km) south of the southern tip of the Baja California peninsula. Low wind shear and warm waters favored development, and the depression intensified into Tropical Storm Nora early on October 2. A day later, an eye started developing in the center, which preceded Nora intensifying into a hurricane on October 4. That day, it attained peak winds of 100 mph (160 km/h) by later that day. Although the NHC anticipated further strengthening to major hurricane status, Nora weakened due to increased wind shear from the developing Tropical Storm Olaf to its east. By October 5, the eye of Nora was no longer evident on satellite imagery, which indicated the beginning of a weakening trend. The convection became ragged, and on October 6 the winds decreased below hurricane-force. Around the same time, a strong approaching mid-level trough caused Nora to slow and turn to the east. Continued wind shear and the presence of dry air stripped the thunderstorms away from the center, and by October 7 all of the deep convection had dissipated. As a result, it was downgraded to a tropical depression, and Nora weakened to the extent that it barely met the criteria for being a tropical cyclone. Nora rapidly accelerated towards the east-northeast toward Mexico in response to the approaching trough. Thunderstorms redeveloped over the center as Nora approached western Mexico, and it made landfall near Mazatlán, Sinaloa early on October 9. It dissipated shortly thereafter over the high terrain of western Mexico.

Ahead of the storm's landfall, Mexico's Servicio Meteorológico Nacional issued advisories and bulletins regarding the threat from the storm. While at its peak, Nora produced high waves. Later when it moved ashore in Sinaloa, it dropped locally heavy rainfall. The peak 24-hour total was 3.75 in (95.3 mm) in Mazatlán, Sinaloa, recorded on October 8. The rainfall maximum for the previous day was 3.43 in (87.0 mm) in Gaviotas, Nayarit. Rainfall from Nora extended was also reported along the Baja California peninsula, and also extended from the coastline northward to near Texas. Moisture from Nora and Olaf interacted with an upper-level low to produce flooding across parts of Texas, forcing a family to evacuate in McGregor. The system also spawned a tornado in Sugar Land that damaged four buildings, including a school.

=== Hurricane Olaf ===
- Category 1 hurricane (SSHWS)
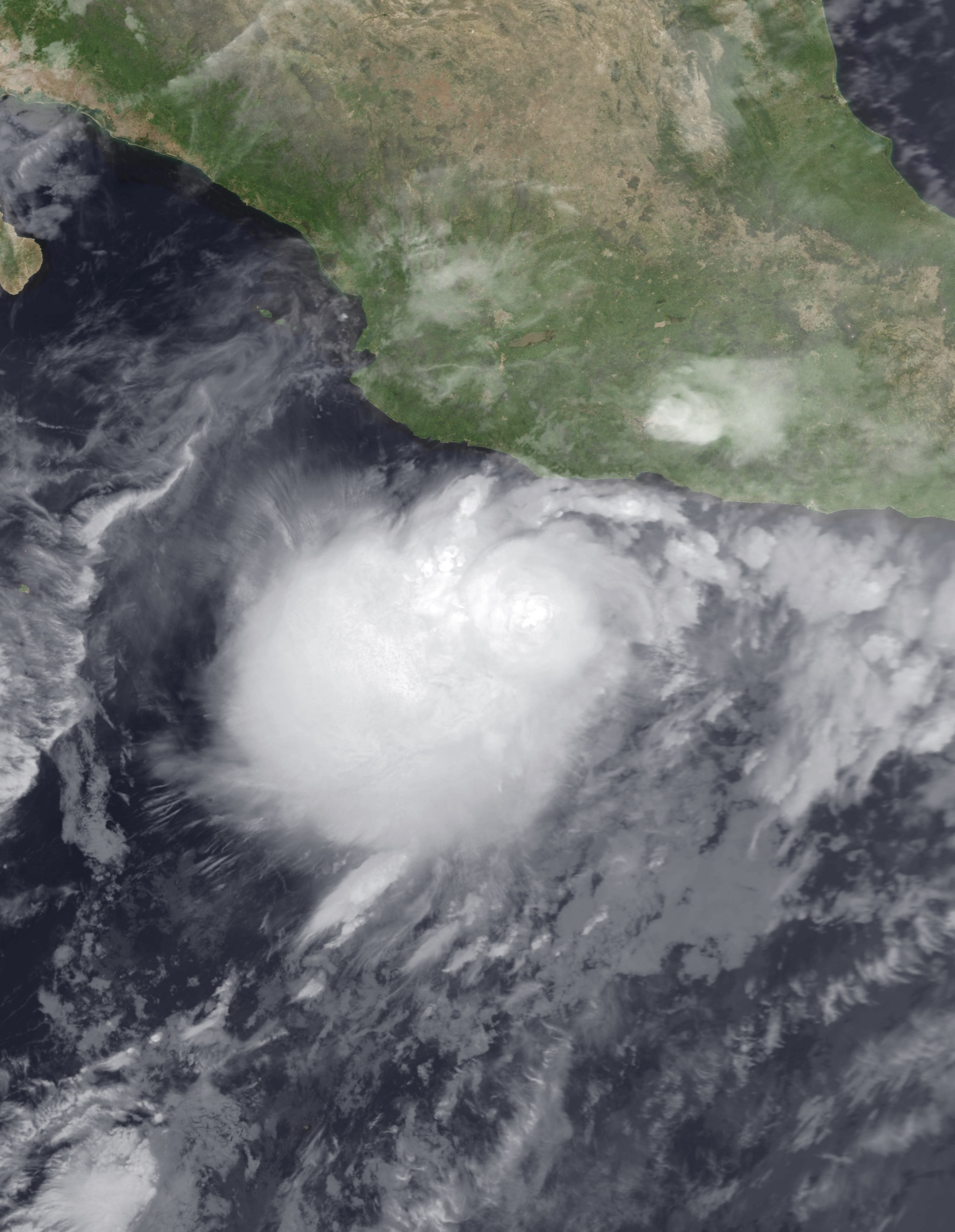
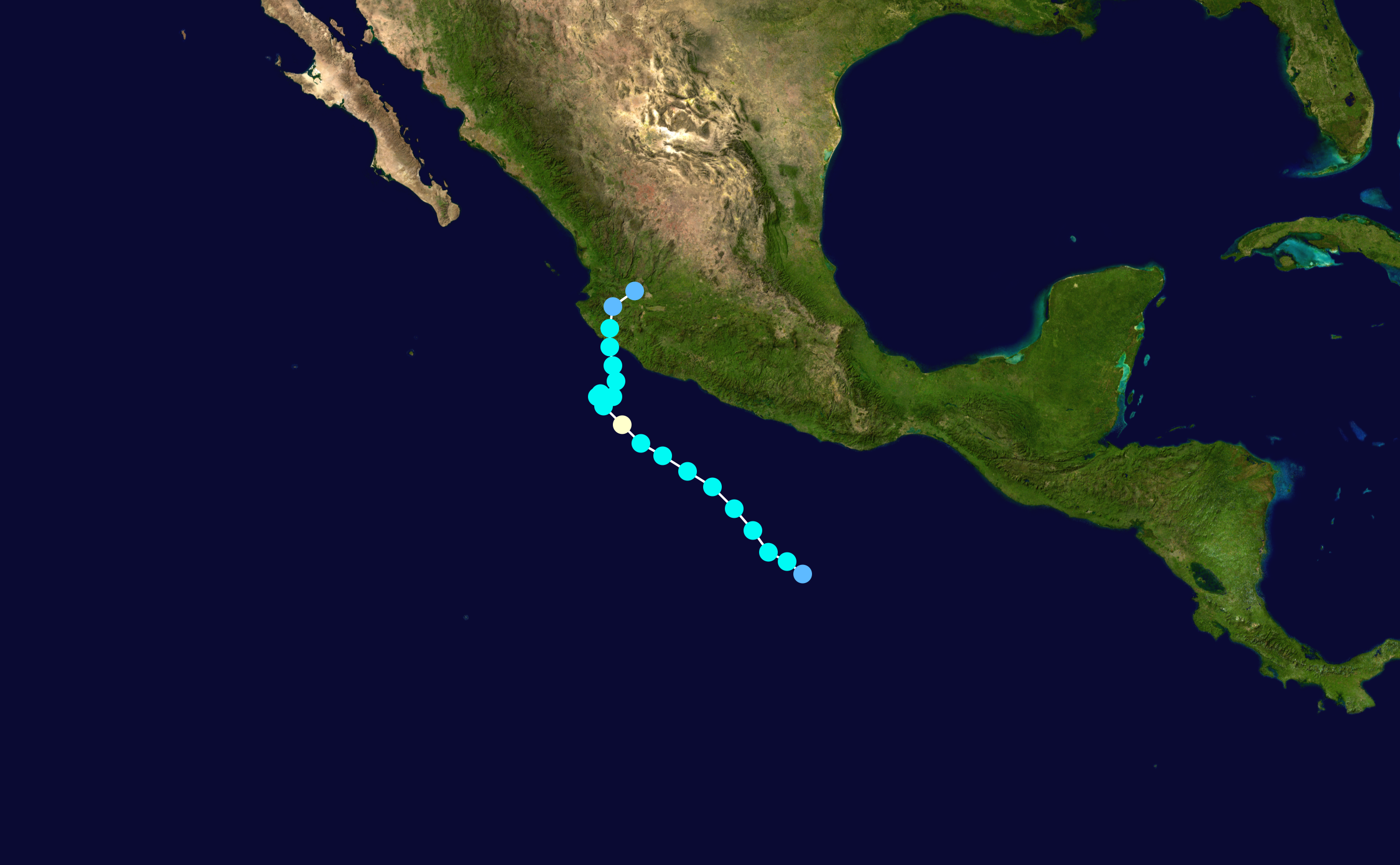
- Duration: October 3 – October 8
- Peak intensity: 75 mph (120 km/h) (1-min); 987 mbar (hPa)

Olaf originated from a tropical wave that exited the coast of Africa on September 17. Over the next two weeks, it moved westbound into the northeastern Pacific Ocean. On October 2, a low-level circulation was noted on satellite imagery off the south coast of Mexico, which became better organized. On October 3, Tropical Depression Eighteen-E developed about 375 mi (600 km) south of Acapulco. Initially, wind shear from nearby Tropical Storm Nora was expected to weaken the system, but this did not occur. Moving northwestward, the depression intensified into Tropical Storm Olaf. On October 5, radar imagery indicated a partial eyewall. Based on this, the NHC upgraded Olaf to hurricane status, with maximum sustained winds of 75 mph (120 km/h) and a barometric pressure of 987 millibars. Olaf was hurricane for only six hours, and it soon became less organized as the motion slowed. By early October 6, Olaf was only a minimal tropical storm, although it reorganized after turning back north toward the coast. On October 8, Olaf made landfall with winds of 60 mph (95 km/h) near Manzanillo. Olaf weakened rapidly over the high terrain of the coast. Within 24 hours, Olaf had dissipated inland.

Various tropical storm and hurricane warnings were issued for parts of Mexico. Local authorities also opened shelters. Olaf was a part of a rainy year in Mexico, producing more rain than Nora. One person was killed, and flooding caused severe damage to roadways and crops in the Mexican state of Jalisco. In the same state, more than 12,000 homes were damaged. In the state of Guanajuato, an estimated total of 15,000 people were impacted from the floods. In addition, two communities were isolated. After the hurricane, a program wanted donation from food to basic home supplies. Moisture from the remnants of Nora and Olaf interacted with an upper-level low to produce heavy rainfall across Texas, producing flooding near Waco that forced a family to evacuate in McGregor. The floodwaters closed portions of Interstate 35, U.S. Route 84, and Texas State Highway 36. It also spawned a tornado in Sugar Land that damaged four buildings, including a school.

=== Hurricane Patricia ===
- Category 1 hurricane (SSHWS)
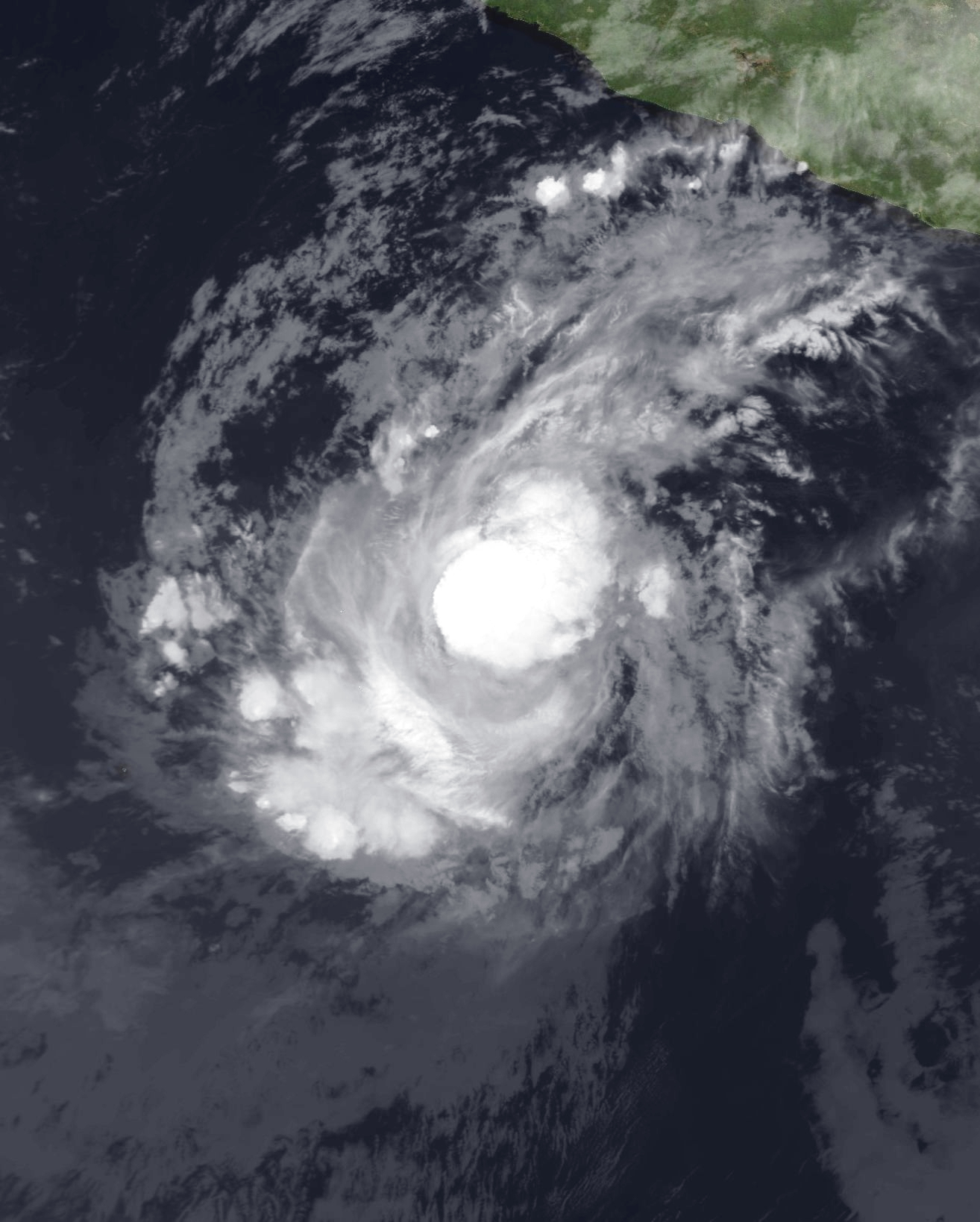
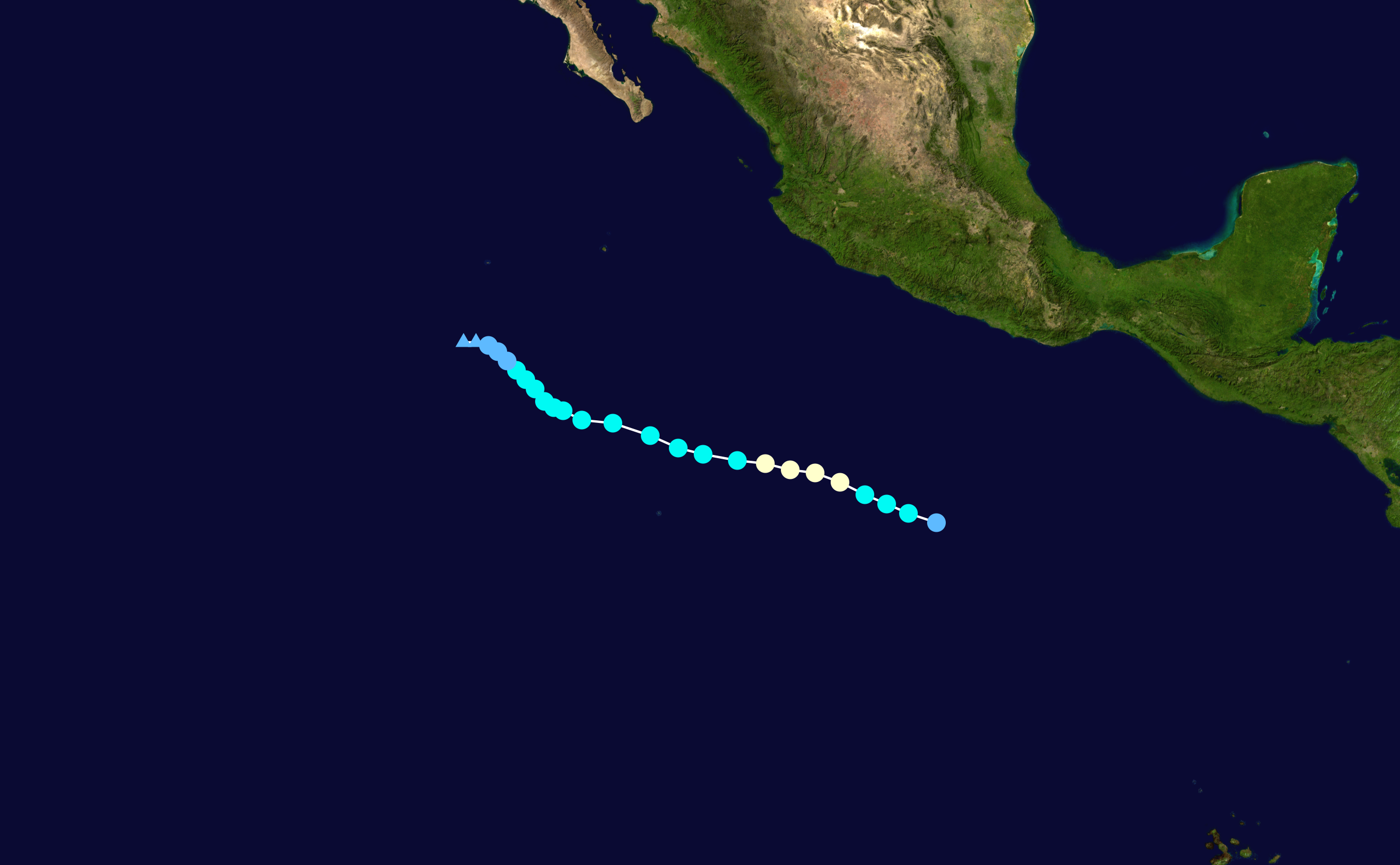
- Duration: October 20 – October 26
- Peak intensity: 80 mph (130 km/h) (1-min); 984 mbar (hPa)

The final storm of the 2003 season began as a tropical wave that crossed Central America on October 17. The incipient disturbance slowly organized as it moved west-northwest south a ridge, organizing into a tropical depression around 12:00 UTC on October 20 about 460 mi (740 km) south of Acapulco. Six hours later, it intensified into Tropical Storm Patricia while paralleling the Mexico coastline well offshore. As banding features increased in association with the cyclone, and as it developed an eye, Patricia became the season's final hurricane around 12:00 UTC on October 21. It peaked with winds of 80 mph (130 km/h) twelve hours later, despite predictions of a much stronger storm. On October 22, the cyclone encountered wind shear associated with an upper-level trough near Baja California, and its circulation quickly became displaced from associated thunderstorm activity. It fell below hurricane strength that day but fluctuated in intensity through October 25. Early that day, Patricia weakened to a tropical depression, and by 06:00 UTC on October 26, it degenerated to a remnant low. The low turned west and dissipated twelve hours later.

== Storm names ==
The following list of names was used for named storms that formed in the North Pacific east of 140°W in 2003. This was the same list used for the 1997 season, except for Patricia, which replaced Pauline. No names were retired from the list by the World Meteorological Organization following the season, and it was used again for the 2009 season.

- Andres
- Blanca
- Carlos
- Dolores
- Enrique
- Felicia
- Guillermo *
- Hilda
- Ignacio
- Jimena *
- Kevin
- Linda
- Marty
- Nora
- Olaf
- Patricia
- Rick (unused)
- Sandra (unused)
- Terry (unused)
- Vivian (unused)
- Waldo (unused)
- Xina (unused)
- York (unused)
- Zelda (unused)

For storms that form in the North Pacific between 140°W and the International Date Line, the names come from a series of four rotating lists. Names are used one after the other without regard to year, and when the bottom of one list is reached, the next named storm receives the name at the top of the next list. No named storms formed in the central North Pacific in 2003. Named storms in the table above that crossed (or their remnants) into the area during the year are noted (*).

== Season effects ==
This is a table of all of the storms that formed in the 2003 Pacific hurricane season. It includes their name, duration, peak classification and intensities, areas affected, damage, and death totals. Deaths in parentheses are additional and indirect (an example of an indirect death would be a traffic accident), but were still related to that storm. Damage and deaths include totals while the storm was extratropical, a wave, or a low, and all of the damage figures are in 2003 USD.

Saffir–Simpson scale
TD	TS	C1	C2	C3	C4	C5

2003 Pacific hurricane season statistics
Storm name	Dates active	Storm category at peak intensity	Max 1-min wind mph (km/h)	Min. press. (mbar)	Areas affected	Damage (US$)	Deaths	Ref(s).
Andres	May 19–25	Tropical storm	60 (95)	997	None	None	None	
Blanca	June 17–22	Tropical storm	60 (95)	997	None	None	None	
Carlos	June 26–27	Tropical storm	65 (100)	996	Southwestern Mexico	$8 million	9	
Dolores	July 6–8	Tropical storm	40 (65)	1005	None	None	None	
Enrique	July 10–13	Tropical storm	65 (100)	993	None	None	None	
Felicia	July 17–23	Tropical storm	50 (85)	1000	None	None	None	
Guillermo	August 7–12	Tropical storm	60 (95)	997	None	None	None	
Hilda	August 9–13	Tropical storm	40 (65)	1004	None	None	None	
One-C	August 15–17	Tropical depression	35 (55)	1009	None	None	None	
Ignacio	August 22–27	Category 2 hurricane	105 (165)	970	Baja California peninsula, Sonora, California	$21 million	4	
Jimena	August 28 – September 5	Category 2 hurricane	105 (165)	970	Hawaii	Minimal	None	
Kevin	September 3–6	Tropical storm	40 (65)	1000	None	None	None	
Linda	September 13–17	Category 1 hurricane	75 (120)	987	None	None	None	
Marty	September 18–24	Category 2 hurricane	100 (155)	970	Baja California Peninsula, Sonora, Sinaloa, Arizona	$100 million	12	
Nora	October 1–9	Category 2 hurricane	105 (165)	969	Mexico, Texas	Minimal	None	
Olaf	October 3–8	Category 1 hurricane	75 (120)	987	Mexico, Texas	Minimal	1	
Patricia	October 20–26	Category 1 hurricane	80 (130)	984	None	None	None	
Season aggregates
17 systems	May 19 – October 26		105 (165)	969		$129 million	26	

== See also ==
- Tropical cyclones in 2003
- List of Pacific hurricane records
- Pacific hurricane season
- 2003 Atlantic hurricane season
- 2003 Pacific typhoon season
- 2003 North Indian Ocean cyclone season
- South-West Indian Ocean cyclone seasons: 2002–03, 2003–04
- Australian region cyclone seasons: 2002–03, 2003–04
- South Pacific cyclone seasons: 2002–03, 2003–04
