= Ignacio (disambiguation) =

Ignacio is a masculine given name. It may also refer to:

== Surname ==
- Arnell Ignacio (born 1964), Filipino game show host, comedian, actor and singer-songwriter
- Dion Ignacio (born 1986), Filipino actor
- Louie Ignacio (born 1968), Filipino television director
- Raily Ignacio (born 1987), Curaçaoan footballer

== Places ==
- Ignacio, California, United States, an unincorporated community
- Ignacio, Colorado, United States, a statutory town

== Other uses ==
- Hurricane Ignacio (disambiguation), seven tropical cyclones of the eastern Pacific Ocean
- Ignacio (English title: Do You Hear the Dogs Barking?), a 1975 Mexican drama film
