= Timeline of the 2003 Pacific hurricane season =

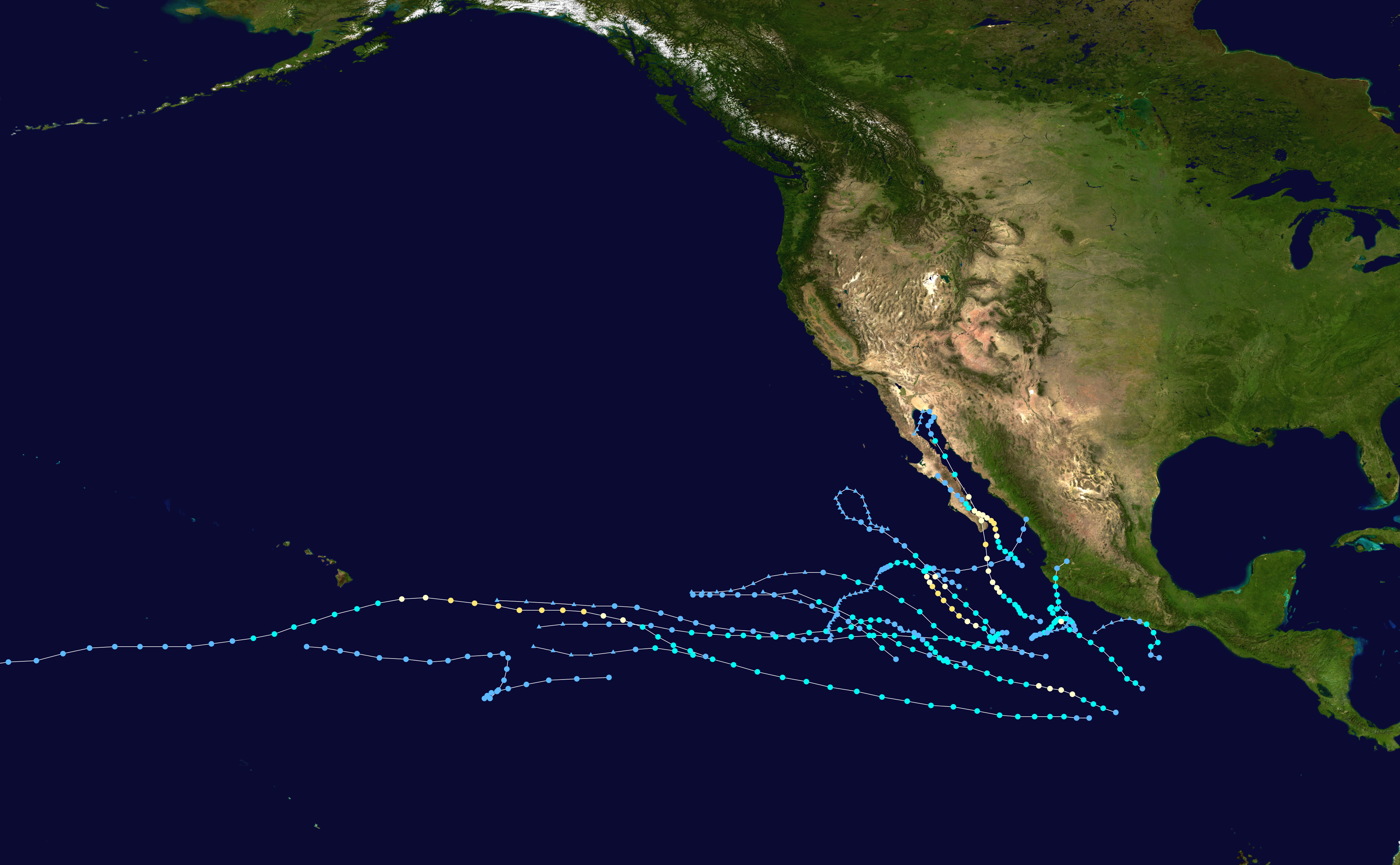
- Season summary map

Season boundaries
- First system formed: May 19, 2003
- Last system dissipated: October 26, 2003

Strongest system
- Name: Nora
- Maximum winds: 105 mph (165 km/h)
- Lowest pressure: 969 mbar (hPa; 28.61 inHg)

Longest lasting system
- Name: Jimena
- Duration: 8.25 (Note: Hurricane Jimena also spent 12 hours as a tropical depression in the Western Pacific basin, giving it a total of 8.75 days as a tropical cyclone.) days
Storm articles
- Tropical Storm Carlos (2003)
- Hurricane Ignacio (2003)
- Hurricane Marty (2003)

The 2003 Pacific hurricane season was the annual cycle of tropical cyclone formation over the Pacific Ocean north of the equator and east of the International Date Line (IDL). The season officially began on May 15 in the Eastern Pacific proper (east of 140°W) and June 1 in the Central Pacific (140°W to the IDL); it ended on November 30 in both areas. Historically, this is the period during which most tropical cyclogenesis occurs in these respective areas. The season's first system, Tropical Storm Andres, developed on May 19; its last, Hurricane Patricia, dissipated on October 26.

The 2003 season produced near-average numbers of named storms and hurricanes—sixteen and seven, respectively. (Note: During the period from 1991 to 2020, an average Pacific hurricane season generated fifteen tropical storms, eight hurricanes, and four major hurricanes.) However, it was the first season since 1977 in which no storms became major hurricanes by reaching Category 3 or higher on the five-level Saffir–Simpson scale. Only one tropical cyclone—a tropical depression that failed to reach tropical storm strength—formed in the Central Pacific basin, although Hurricane Jimena attained its peak intensity there after entering from the Eastern Pacific basin. Despite the overall low seasonal activity, an unusually large number of tropical cyclones made landfall in Mexico. The country was directly struck by a tropical depression, Nora; two tropical storms, Carlos and Olaf; and two hurricanes, Ignacio and Marty.

This timeline documents tropical cyclone formations, strengthenings, weakenings, landfalls, and dissipations during the season. It includes information that was not released during the season, meaning that data from post-storm reviews by the National Hurricane Center (NHC) and the Central Pacific Hurricane Center has been included.

The timestamp for each event is first stated using Coordinated Universal Time (UTC), the 24-hour clock where 00:00 = midnight UTC. The NHC uses both UTC and the time zone where the center of the tropical cyclone was then located. Prior to 2015, two time zones were utilized in the Eastern Pacific basin: Pacific for the Eastern Pacific, and Hawaii−Aleutian for the Central Pacific. In this timeline, the respective area time is included in parentheses. Additionally, figures for maximum sustained winds and position estimates are rounded to the nearest 5 units (miles or kilometers), following NHC practice. Direct wind observations are rounded to the nearest whole number. Atmospheric pressures are listed to the nearest millibar and nearest hundredth of an inch of mercury.

== Timeline of events ==
=== May ===
May 15

- The 2003 Eastern Pacific hurricane season officially begins.

May 19

- 18:00 UTC (11:00 p.m. PDT) at 9.6°N 102.2°W – Tropical Depression One-E forms from an area of disturbed weather about 1,055 mi (1,695 km) south-southeast of Cabo San Lucas, Baja California Sur.

May 20

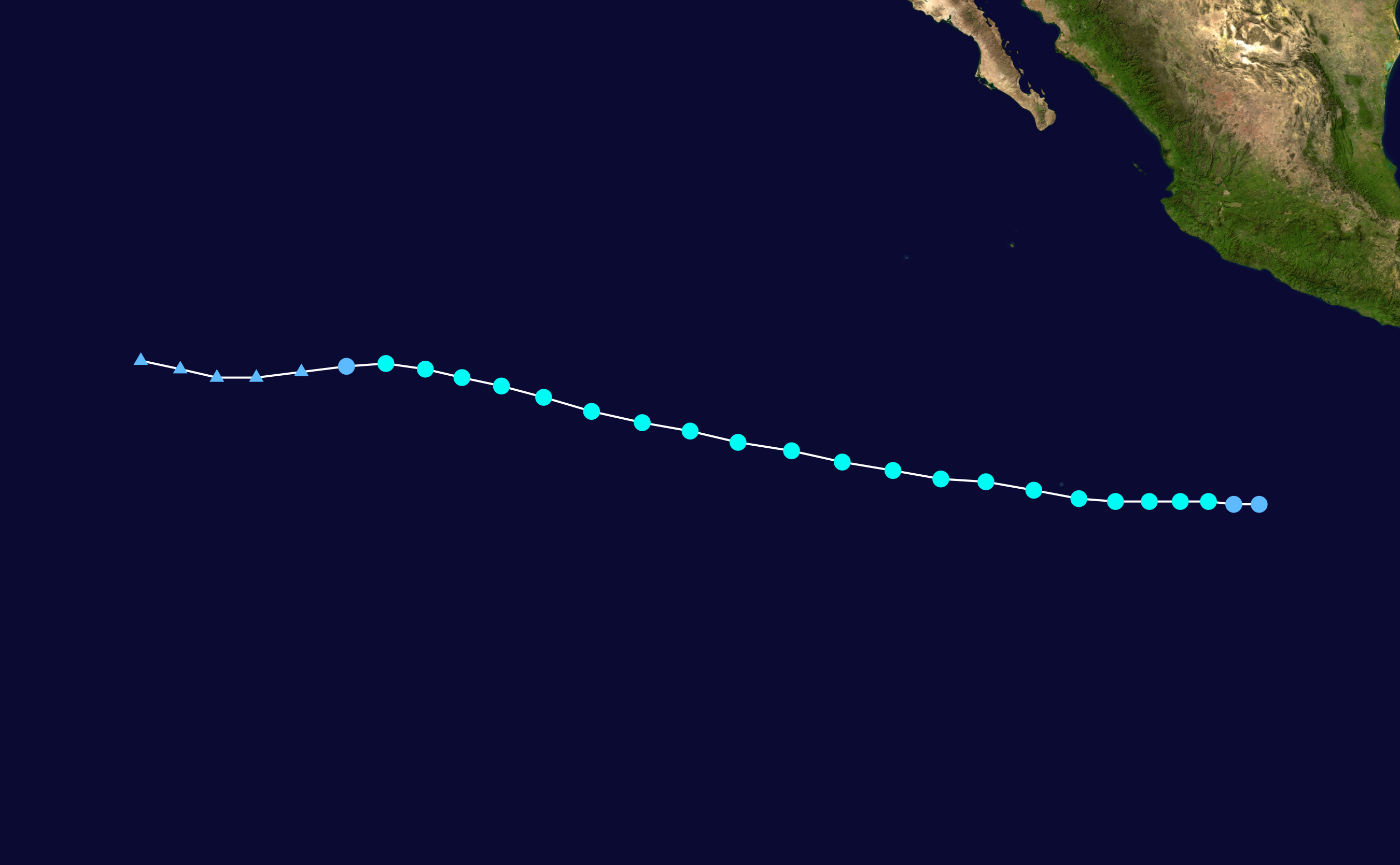
Storm path of Tropical Storm Andres

- 06:00 UTC (11:00 p.m. PDT, May 19) at 9.7°N 104.0°W – Tropical Depression One-E strengthens into Tropical Storm Andres about 990 mi (1,595 km) south-southeast of Cabo San Lucas.
- 18:00 UTC (11:00 a.m. PDT) at 9.7°N 106.1°W – Tropical Storm Andres attains its peak intensity, with maximum sustained winds of 60 mph (95 km/h) and a minimum central pressure of 997 mbar (29.44 inHg), about 945 mi (1,520 km) south-southeast of Cabo San Lucas.

May 25

- 06:00 UTC (11:00 p.m. PDT, May 24) at 14.5°N 134.6°W – Tropical Storm Andres weakens into a tropical depression about 1,710 mi (2,750 km) west-southwest of Cabo San Lucas.
- 12:00 UTC (5:00 a.m. PDT) at 14.3°N 136.2°W – Tropical Depression Andres degenerates into a remnant low about 1,810 mi (2,915 km) west-southwest of Cabo San Lucas, and later dissipates.

=== June ===
June 1

- The 2003 Central Pacific hurricane season officially begins.

June 17

- 00:00 UTC (5:00 p.m. PDT, June 16) at 15.9°N 103.2°W – Tropical Depression Two-E forms from an interaction between a tropical wave and an area of disturbed weather about 155 mi (250 km) south-southwest of Lázaro Cárdenas, Michoacán.
- 18:00 UTC (11:00 a.m. PDT) at 16.5°N 103.5°W – Tropical Depression Two-E strengthens into Tropical Storm Blanca about 130 mi (215 km) southwest of Lázaro Cárdenas.

June 18

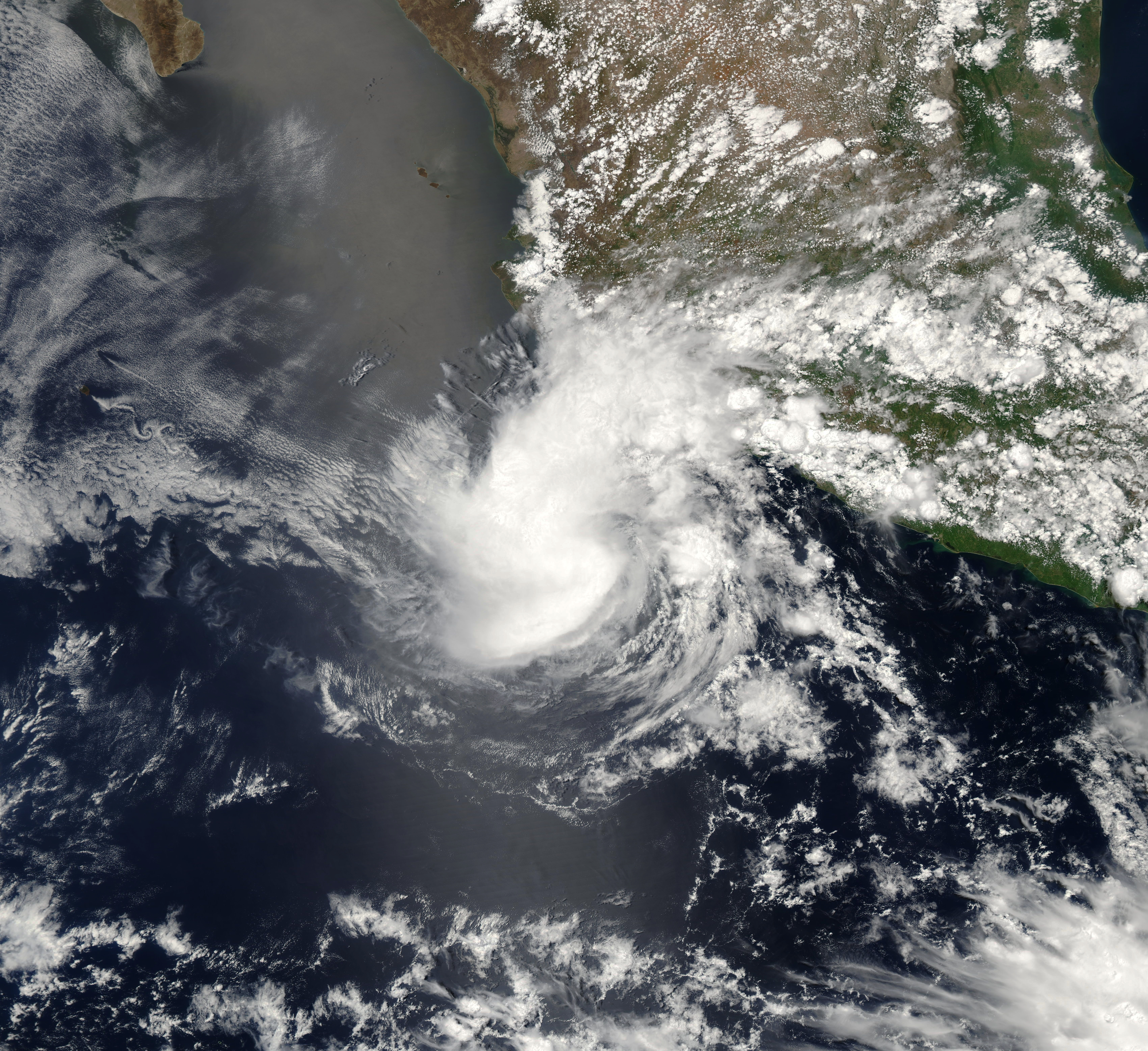
Tropical Storm Blanca near peak intensity late on June 18

- 18:00 UTC (11:00 a.m. PDT) at 16.7°N 104.3°W – Tropical Storm Blanca attains its peak intensity, with maximum sustained winds of 60 mph (95 km/h) and a minimum central pressure of 997 mbar (29.44 inHg), about 160 mi (260 km) west-southwest of Lázaro Cárdenas.

June 20

- 18:00 UTC (11:00 a.m. PDT) at 15.5°N 106.0°W – Tropical Storm Blanca weakens into a tropical depression about 305 mi (490 km) southwest of Lázaro Cárdenas.

June 22

- 12:00 UTC (5:00 a.m. PDT) at 15.8°N 104.9°W – Tropical Depression Blanca degenerates into a remnant low about 230 mi (370 km) southwest of Lázaro Cárdenas, and later dissipates.

June 26

- 00:00 UTC (5:00 p.m. PDT, June 25) at 13.9°N 97.2°W – Tropical Depression Three-E forms from a tropical wave about 130 mi (215 km) south of Puerto Ángel, Oaxaca.
- 12:00 UTC (5:00 a.m. PDT) at 14.7°N 97.8°W – Tropical Depression Three-E strengthens into Tropical Storm Carlos about 110 mi (175 km) southwest of Puerto Ángel.

June 27

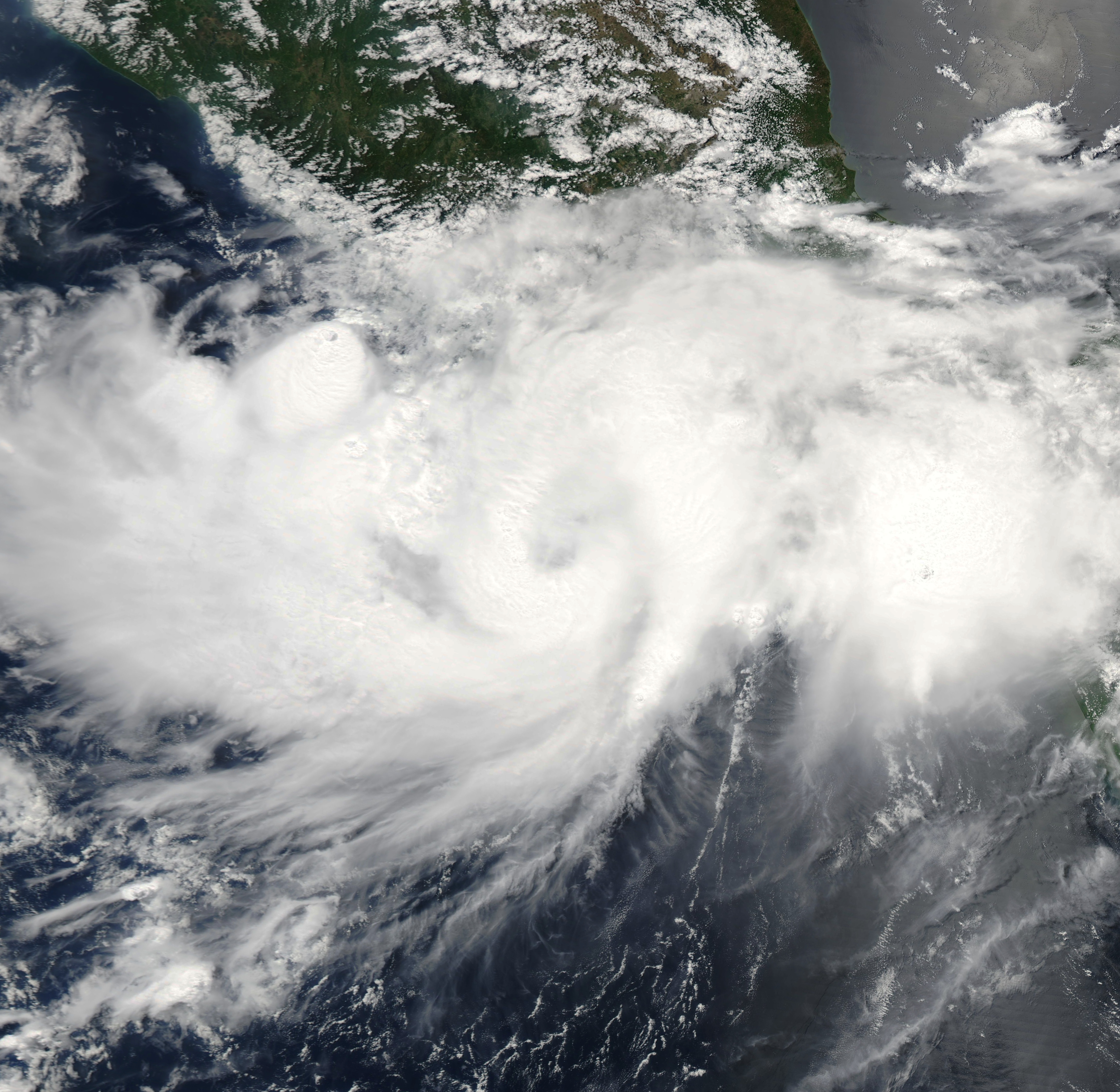
A strengthening Tropical Storm Carlos approaching Mexico late on June 26

- 00:00 UTC (5:00 p.m. PDT, June 26) at 15.7°N 97.6°W – Tropical Storm Carlos attains its peak intensity, with maximum sustained winds of 65 mph (100 km/h) and a minimum central pressure of 996 mbar (29.41 inHg), about 75 mi (120 km) west of Puerto Ángel, or about 35 mi (55 km) west-southwest of Puerto Escondido, Oaxaca.
- 03:00 UTC (8:00 p.m. PDT, June 26) at 16.0°N 97.8°W – Tropical Storm Carlos makes landfall about 50 mi (85 km) west of Puerto Escondido at its peak intensity.
- 12:00 UTC (5:00 a.m. PDT) at 16.5°N 98.6°W – Tropical Storm Carlos weakens into a tropical depression over land about 110 mi (175 km) west-northwest of Puerto Escondido.
- 18:00 UTC (11:00 a.m. PDT) at 16.7°N 99.3°W – Tropical Depression Carlos degenerates into a remnant low over land about 160 mi (260 km) west-northwest of Puerto Escondido, and later dissipates after reemerging over the Pacific Ocean.

=== July ===
July 6

- 06:00 UTC (11:00 p.m. PDT, July 5) at 13.8°N 116.0°W – Tropical Depression Four-E forms from a tropical wave about 740 mi (1,195 km) south-southwest of Cabo San Lucas.
- 12:00 UTC (5:00 a.m. PDT) at 14.6°N 117.0°W – Tropical Depression Four-E strengthens into Tropical Storm Dolores about 730 mi (1,175 km) southwest of Cabo San Lucas. It simultaneously attains its peak intensity, with maximum sustained winds of 40 mph (65 km/h) and a minimum central pressure of 1005 mbar (29.68 inHg).

July 7

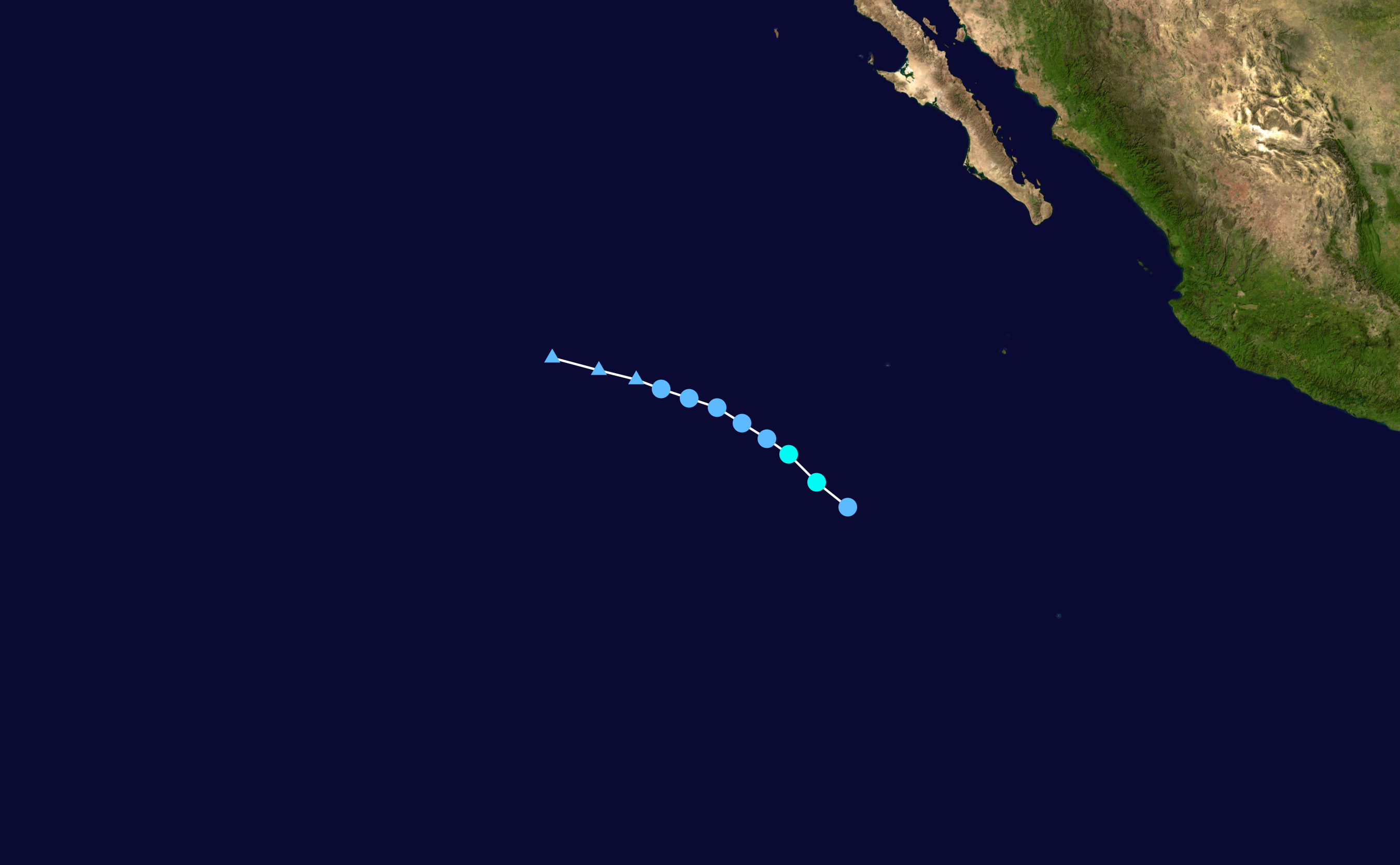
Storm path of Tropical Storm Dolores

- 00:00 UTC (5:00 p.m. PDT, July 6) at 16.0°N 118.6°W – Tropical Storm Dolores weakens into a tropical depression about 735 mi (1,185 km) southwest of Cabo San Lucas.

July 8

- 06:00 UTC (11:00 p.m. PDT, July 7) at 17.9°N 122.8°W – Tropical Depression Dolores degenerates into a remnant low about 900 mi (1,445 km) west-southwest of Cabo San Lucas, and later dissipates.

July 10

- 12:00 UTC (5:00 a.m. PDT) at 14.1°N 106.3°W – Tropical Depression Five-E forms from a tropical wave about 650 mi (1,045 km) south-southeast of Cabo San Lucas.

July 11

- 12:00 UTC (5:00 a.m. PDT) at 14.7°N 110.4°W – Tropical Depression Five-E strengthens into Tropical Storm Enrique about 565 mi (905 km) south of Cabo San Lucas.

July 12

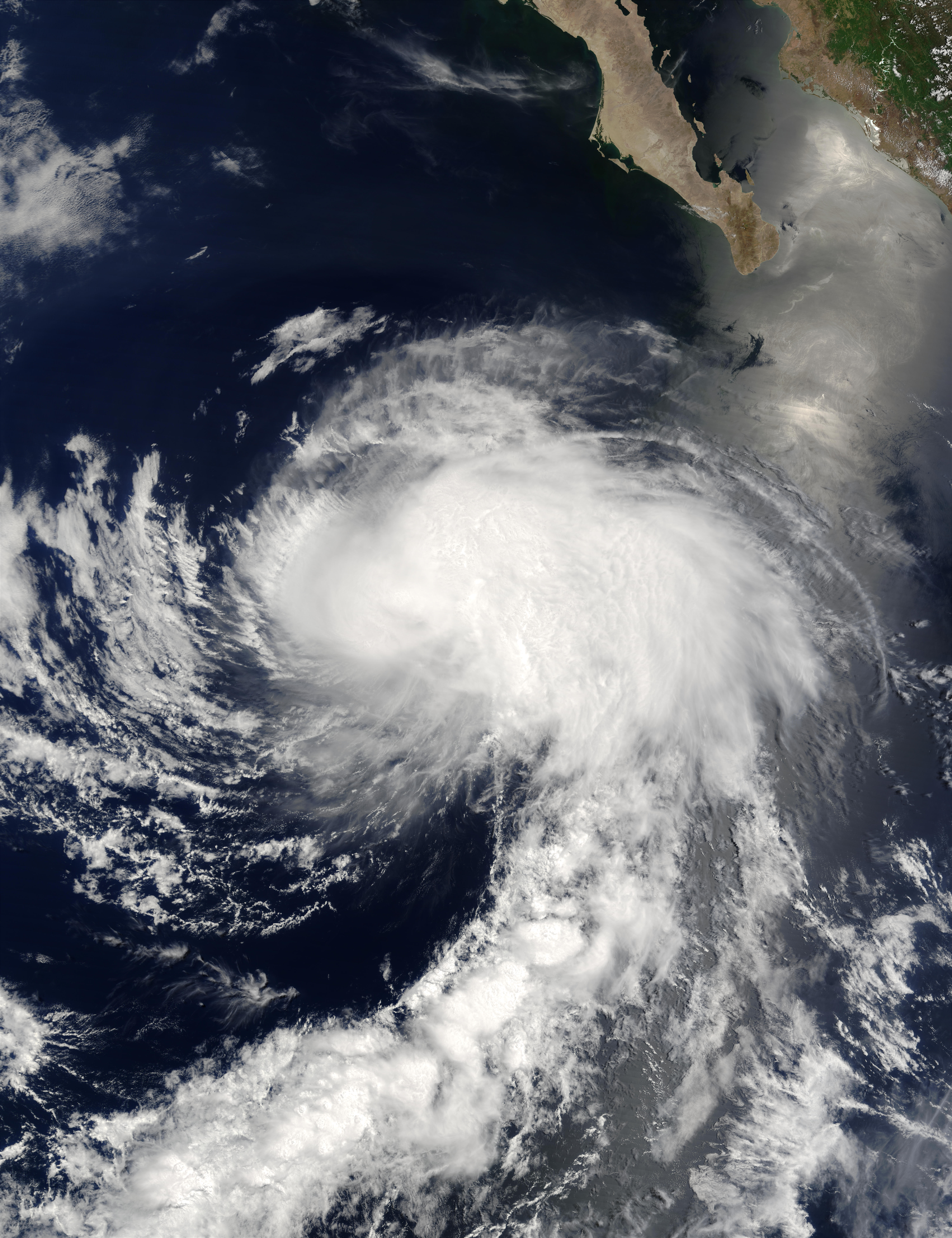
Tropical Storm Enrique near peak intensity on July 12

- 06:00 UTC (11:00 p.m. PDT, July 11) at 16.2°N 113.3°W – Tropical Storm Enrique attains its peak intensity, with maximum sustained winds of 65 mph (100 km/h) and a minimum central pressure of 993 mbar (29.32 inHg), about 510 mi (825 km) south-southwest of Cabo San Lucas.

July 13

- 18:00 UTC (11:00 a.m. PDT) at 20.0°N 121.2°W – Tropical Storm Enrique weakens into a tropical depression about 750 mi (1,205 km) west-southwest of Cabo San Lucas.

July 14

- 00:00 UTC (5:00 p.m. PDT, July 13) at 20.0°N 122.5°W – Tropical Depression Enrique degenerates into a remnant low about 830 mi (1,335 km) west-southwest of Cabo San Lucas, and later dissipates.

July 17

- 18:00 UTC (11:00 a.m. PDT) at 14.0°N 105.3°W – Tropical Depression Six-E forms from a tropical wave about 355 mi (575 km) south of Manzanillo, Colima.

July 18

- 06:00 UTC (11:00 p.m. PDT, July 17) at 14.6°N 108.7°W – Tropical Depression Six-E strengthens into Tropical Storm Felicia about 420 mi (675 km) southwest of Manzanillo.
- 12:00 UTC (5:00 a.m. PDT) at 14.9°N 110.1°W – Tropical Storm Felicia attains its peak intensity, with maximum sustained winds of 50 mph (85 km/h) and a minimum central pressure of 1000 mbar (29.53 inHg), about 480 mi (770 km) southwest of Manzanillo, or about 550 mi (890 km) south of Cabo San Lucas.

July 20

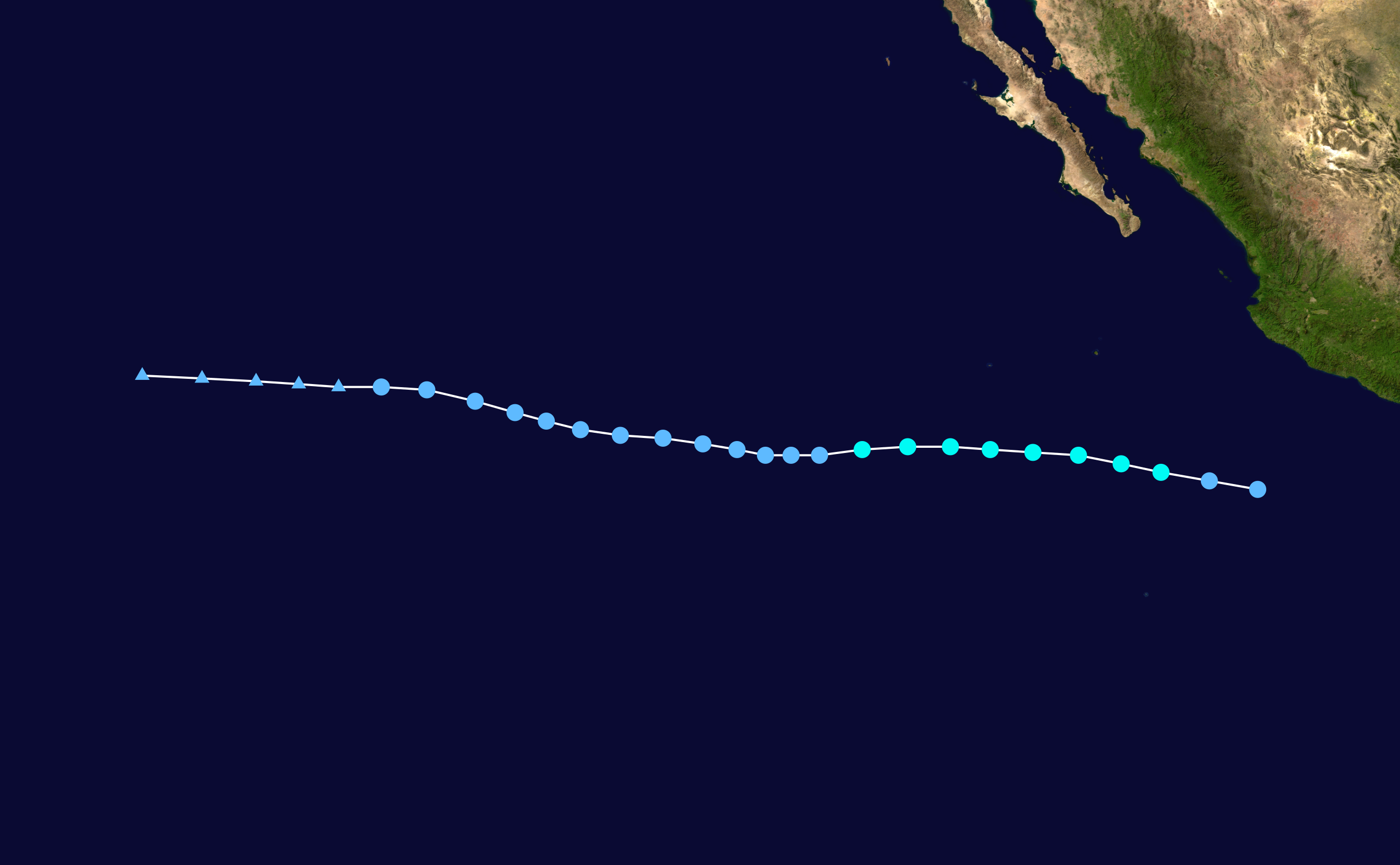
Storm path of Tropical Storm Felicia

- 06:00 UTC (11:00 p.m. PDT, July 19) at 15.2°N 120.7°W – Tropical Storm Felicia weakens into a tropical depression about 880 mi (1,415 km) southwest of Cabo San Lucas.

July 23

- 12:00 UTC (5:00 a.m. PDT) at 17.6°N 137.6°W – Tropical Depression Felicia degenerates into a remnant low about 1,825 mi (2,935 km) west of Cabo San Lucas, and later dissipates about 690 mi (1,110 km) east of the Hawaiian Islands.

=== August ===
August 7

- 06:00 UTC (11:00 p.m. PDT) at 16.0°N 115.7°W – Tropical Depression Seven-E forms from a tropical wave about 605 mi (970 km) southwest of Cabo San Lucas.

August 8

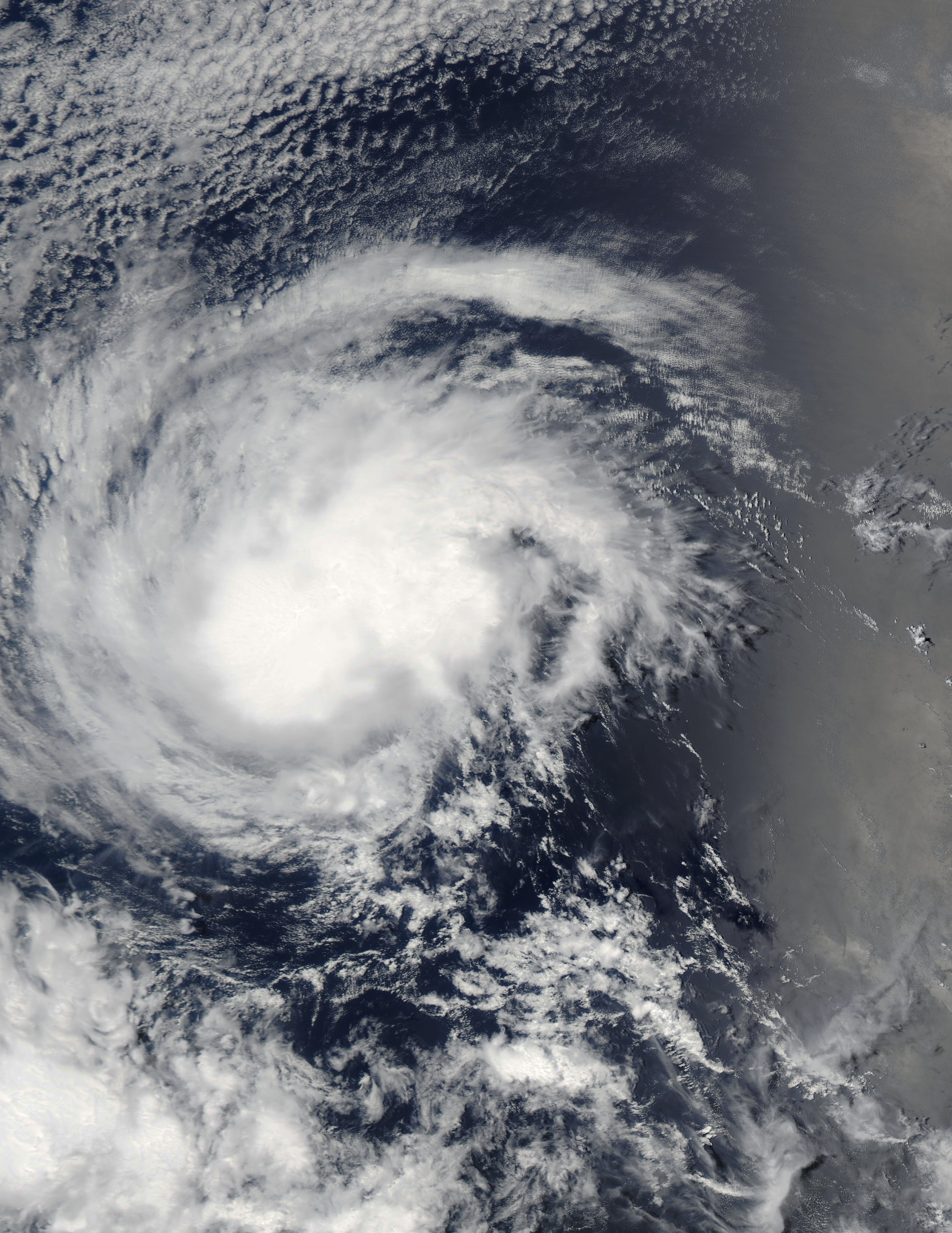
Tropical Storm Guillero at peak intensity late on August 8

- 00:00 UTC (5:00 p.m. PDT, August 7) at 16.6°N 117.2°W – Tropical Depression Seven-E strengthens into Tropical Storm Guillermo about 640 mi (1,030 km) southwest of Cabo San Lucas.
- 18:00 UTC (11:00 a.m. PDT) at 16.1°N 119.2°W – Tropical Storm Guillermo attains its peak intensity, with maximum sustained winds of 60 mph (95 km/h) and a minimum central pressure of 997 mbar (29.44 inHg), about 760 mi (1,220 km) southwest of Cabo San Lucas.

August 9

- 06:00 UTC (11:00 p.m. PDT, August 8) at 13.5°N 111.1°W – Tropical Depression Eight-E forms from a tropical wave about 650 mi (1,045 km) south of Cabo San Lucas.

August 10

- 00:00 UTC (5:00 p.m. PDT, August 9) at 14.5°N 114.8°W – Tropical Depression Eight-E strengthens into Tropical Storm Hilda about 660 mi (1,065 km) south-southwest of Cabo San Lucas.
- 06:00 UTC (11:00 p.m. PDT, August 9) at 14.9°N 115.8°W – Tropical Storm Hilda attains its peak intensity, with maximum sustained winds of 40 mph (65 km/h) and a minimum central pressure of 1004 mbar (29.65 inHg), about 665 mi (1,075 km) southwest of Cabo San Lucas.

August 11

- 12:00 UTC (5:00 a.m. PDT) at 15.9°N 132.0°W – Tropical Storm Guillermo weakens into a tropical depression about 1,515 mi (2,435 km) west-southwest of Cabo San Lucas.
- 18:00 UTC (11:00 a.m. PDT) at 18.6°N 123.2°W – Tropical Storm Hilda weakens into a tropical depression about 905 mi (1,455 km) west-southwest of Cabo San Lucas.

August 12

- 18:00 UTC (11:00 a.m. PDT) at 16.2°N 139.8°W – Tropical Depression Guillermo degenerates into a remnant low about 1,990 mi (3,205 km) west-southwest of Cabo San Lucas, and later dissipates.

August 13

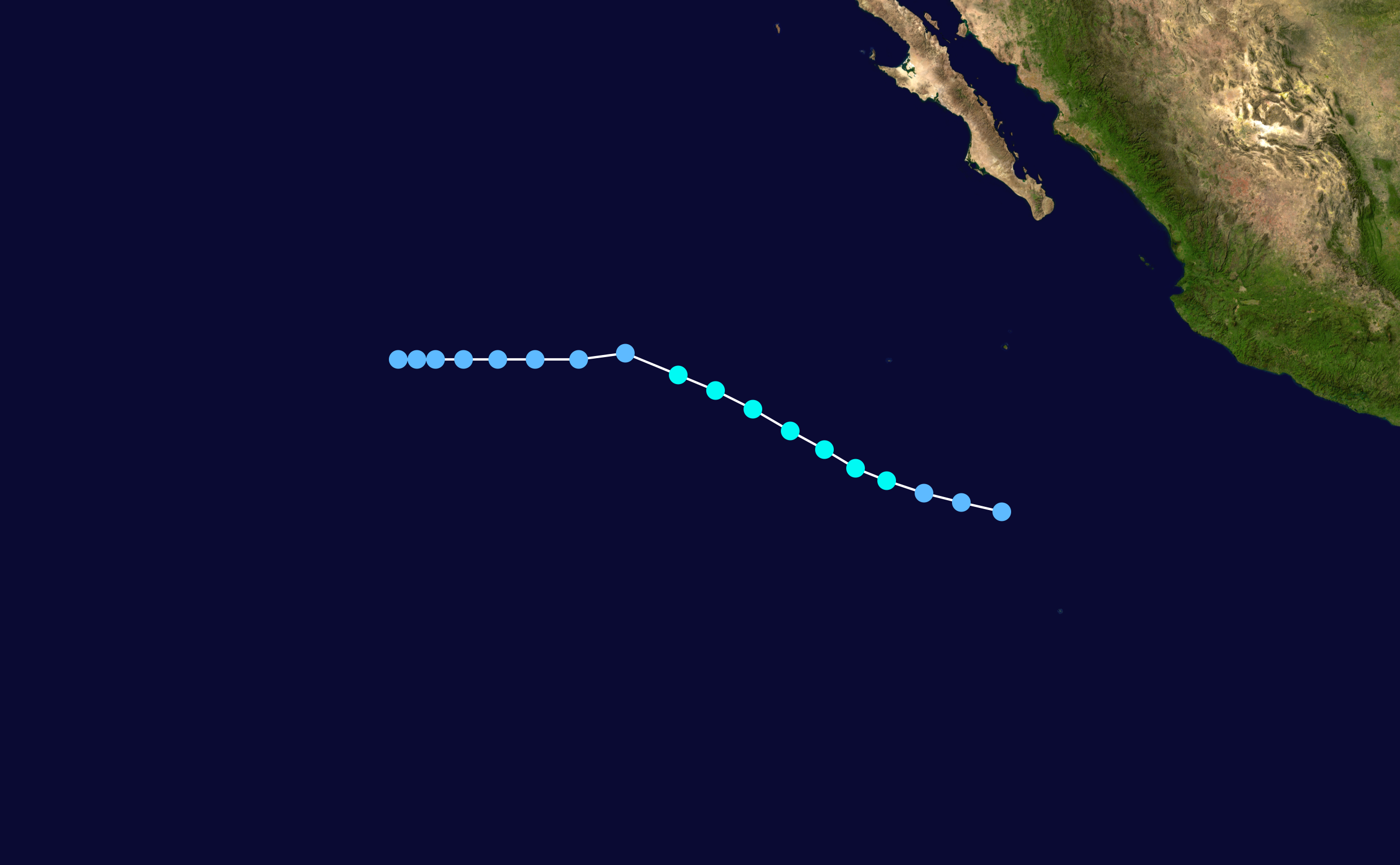
Storm path of Tropical Storm Hilda

- 12:00 UTC (5:00 a.m. PDT) at 18.4°N 130.5°W – Tropical Depression Hilda is last noted as a tropical cyclone about 1,365 mi (2,195 km) west of Cabo San Lucas, dissipating shortly thereafter.

August 15

- 18:00 UTC (8:00 a.m. HST) at 13.6°N 151.0°W – Tropical Depression One-C forms from a monsoon trough about 480 mi (770 km) southeast of South Point, Hawaii. It is already at its peak intensity, with maximum sustained winds of 35 mph (55 km/h) and a minimum central pressure of 1009 mbar (29.80 inHg). (Note: The Eastern and Central North Pacific Hurricane Database (HURDAT) begins the track of Tropical Depression One-C at 12.5°N 136.5°W on August 11 at 00:00 UTC (August 10 at 2:00 p.m. HST).)

August 17

- 00:00 UTC (2:00 p.m. HST, August 16) at 14.7°N 158.1°W – Tropical Depression One-C degenerates into a remnant low about 335 mi (535 km) south-southwest of South Point, and later dissipates. (Note: HURDAT maintains Tropical Depression One-C as a tropical cyclone at 00:00 UTC on August 17 (2:00 p.m. HST on August 16), terminating it afterwards.)

August 22

- 12:00 UTC (5:00 a.m. PDT) at 20.5°N 107.0°W – Tropical Depression Nine-E forms from a tropical wave about 255 mi (405 km) southeast of Cabo San Lucas.

August 23

- 00:00 UTC (5:00 p.m. PDT, August 22) at 21.0°N 107.5°W – Tropical Depression Nine-E strengthens into Tropical Storm Ignacio about 200 mi (325 km) southeast of Cabo San Lucas.

August 24

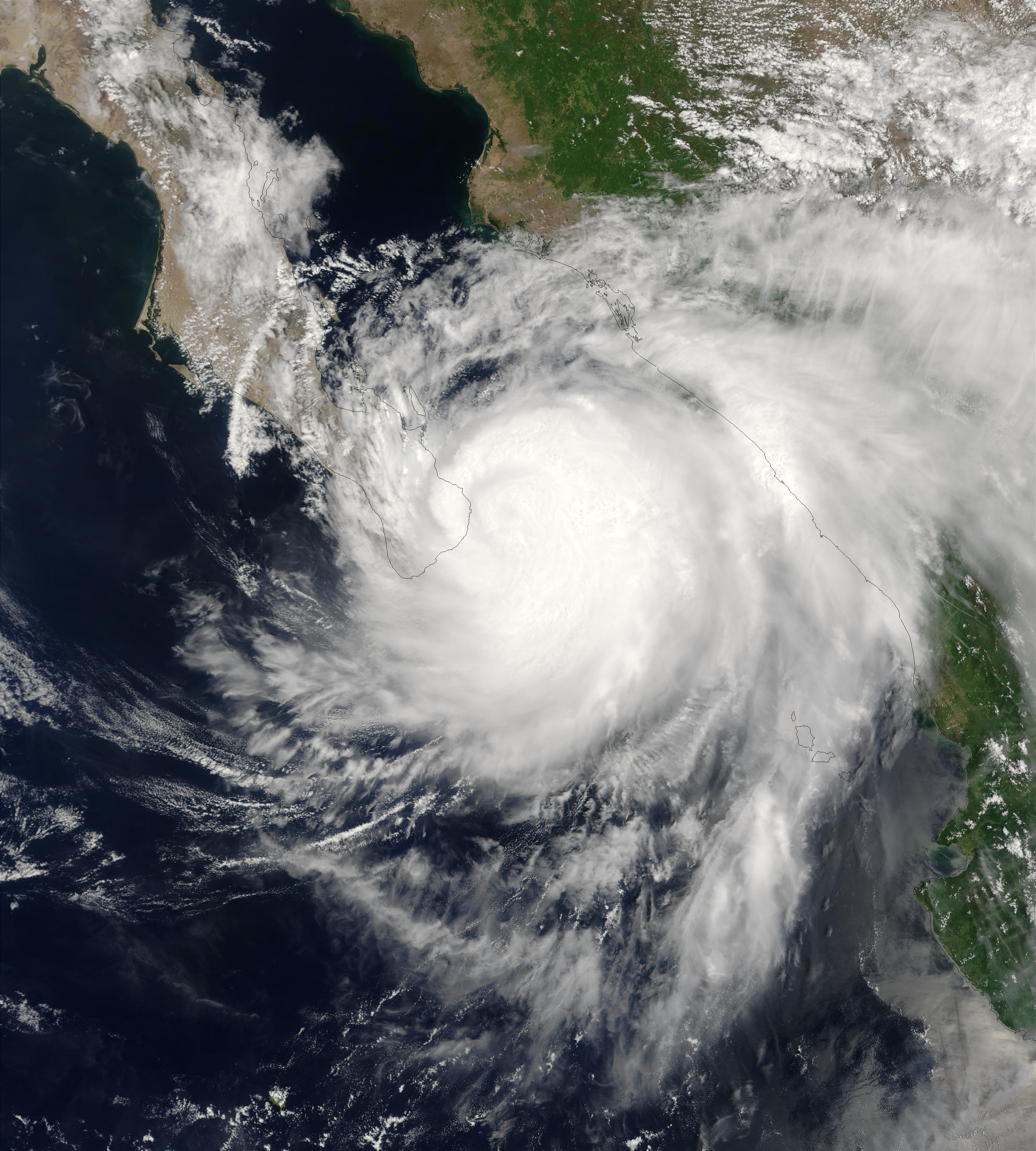
Hurricane Ignacio near peak intensity on August 24

- 06:00 UTC (11:00 p.m. PDT, August 23) at 22.6°N 108.8°W – Tropical Storm Ignacio strengthens into a Category 1 hurricane on the Saffir–Simpson scale about 75 mi (120 km) east-southeast of Cabo San Lucas.
- 12:00 UTC (5:00 a.m. PDT) at 23.1°N 108.9°W – Hurricane Ignacio strengthens to Category 2 intensity about 70 mi (110 km) east-northeast of Cabo San Lucas, or about 115 mi (185 km) southeast of La Paz, Baja California Sur. It simultaneously attains its peak intensity, with maximum sustained winds of 105 mph (165 km/h) and a minimum central pressure of 970 mbar (28.64 inHg).

August 25

- 06:00 UTC (11:00 p.m. PDT, August 24) at 23.9°N 109.5°W – Hurricane Ignacio weakens to Category 1 intensity about 50 mi (85 km) east-southeast of La Paz.
- 18:00 UTC (11:00 a.m. PDT) at 24.2°N 110.1°W – Hurricane Ignacio makes landfall just east of La Paz with maximum sustained winds of 80 mph (130 km/h) and a central pressure of 985 mbar (29.09 inHg).

August 26

- 06:00 UTC (11:00 p.m. PDT, August 25) at 24.6°N 110.8°W – Hurricane Ignacio weakens into a tropical storm over land about 45 mi (75 km) northwest of La Paz.
- 18:00 UTC (11:00 a.m. PDT) at 25.2°N 111.3°W – Tropical Storm Ignacio weakens into a tropical depression over land about 100 mi (155 km) northwest of La Paz.

August 27

- 18:00 UTC (11:00 a.m. PDT) at 26.9°N 113.0°W – Tropical Depression Ignacio degenerates into a remnant low over land about 340 mi (545 km) northwest of La Paz, dissipating shortly thereafter.

August 28

- 06:00 UTC (11:00 p.m. PDT, August 27) at 14.0°N 129.6°W – Tropical Depression Ten-E forms from an Intertropical Convergence Zone (ITCZ) disturbance about 1,710 mi (2,750 km) east of Cape Kumukahi Light in Hawaii.
- 12:00 UTC (5:00 a.m. PDT) at 14.4°N 130.7°W – Tropical Depression Ten-E strengthens into Tropical Storm Jimena about 1,630 mi (2,620 km) east of Cape Kumukahi Light.

August 29

- 12:00 UTC (5:00 a.m. PDT) at 16.6°N 135.5°W – Tropical Storm Jimena strengthens into a Category 1 hurricane about 1,285 mi (2,065 km) east of Cape Kumukahi Light.

August 30

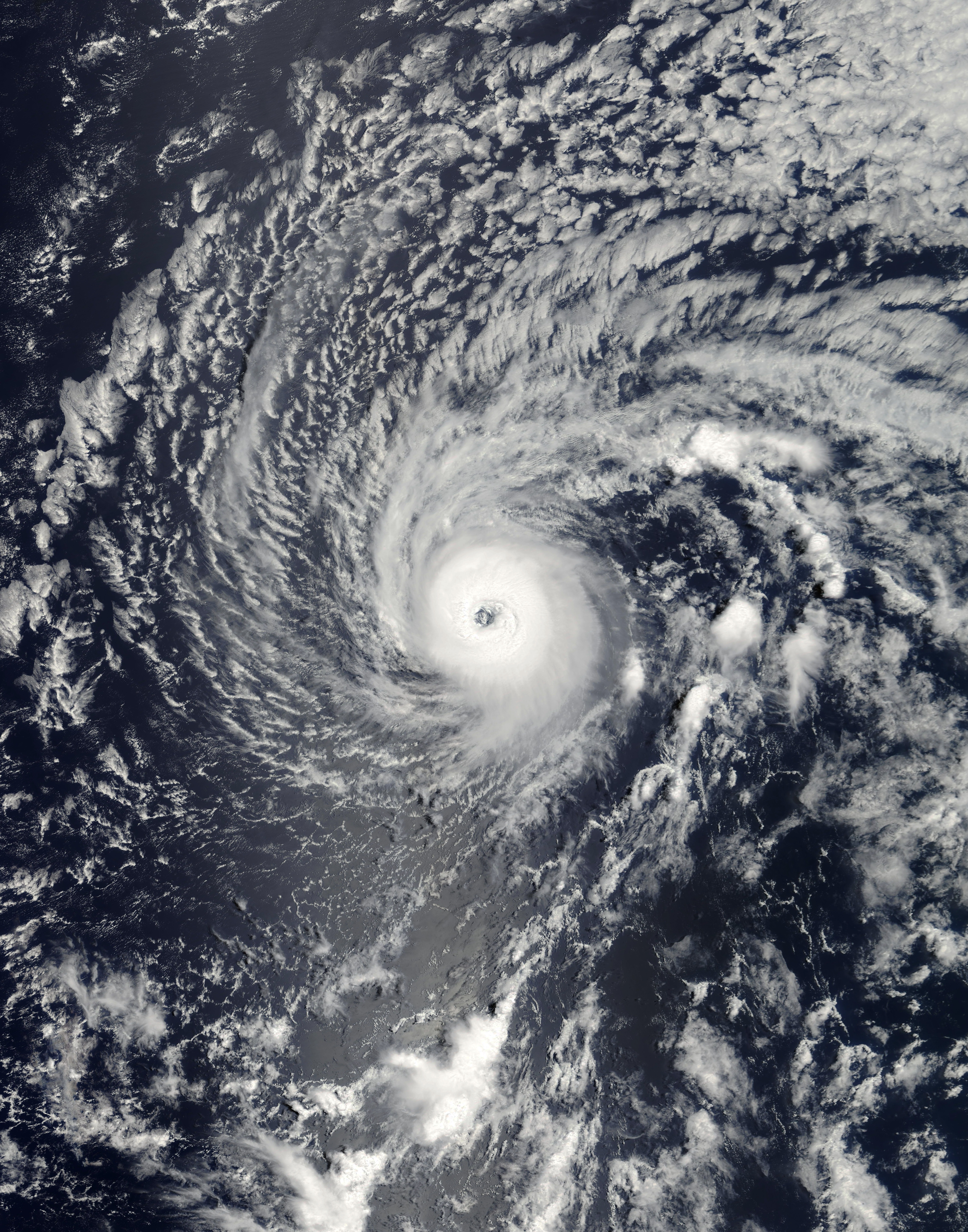
Hurricane Jimena near peak intensity late on August 30

- 00:00 UTC (5:00 p.m. PDT, August 29) at 17.2°N 138.3°W – Hurricane Jimena strengthens to Category 2 intensity about 1,095 mi (1,760 km) east of Cape Kumukahi Light.
- 12:00 UTC (2:00 a.m. HST) at 17.3°N 141.3°W – Hurricane Jimena crosses 140°W into the Central Pacific basin about 900 mi (1,445 km) east of Cape Kumukahi Light.
- 18:00 UTC (8:00 a.m. HST) at 17.3°N 142.9°W – Hurricane Jimena attains its peak intensity, with maximum sustained winds of 105 mph (165 km/h) and a minimum central pressure of 970 mbar (28.64 inHg), about 795 mi (1,280 km) east of Cape Kumukahi Light.

August 31

- 18:00 UTC (8:00 a.m. HST) at 18.2°N 149.6°W – Hurricane Jimena weakens to Category 1 intensity about 350 mi (565 km) east-southeast of Cape Kumukahi Light.

=== September ===
September 1

- 06:00 UTC (8:00 p.m. HST, August 31) at 17.8°N 153.0°W – Hurricane Jimena weakens into a tropical storm about 165 mi (270 km) southeast of Cape Kumukahi Light, or about 190 mi (305 km) east-southeast of South Point.

September 3

- 00:00 UTC (2:00 p.m. HST, September 2) at 15.1°N 163.4°W – Tropical Storm Jimena weakens into a tropical depression about 575 mi (925 km) west-southwest of South Point.
- 12:00 UTC (5:00 a.m. PDT) at 19.0°N 111.5°W – Tropical Depression Eleven-E forms from a tropical wave about 290 mi (465 km) south-southwest of Cabo San Lucas.

September 4

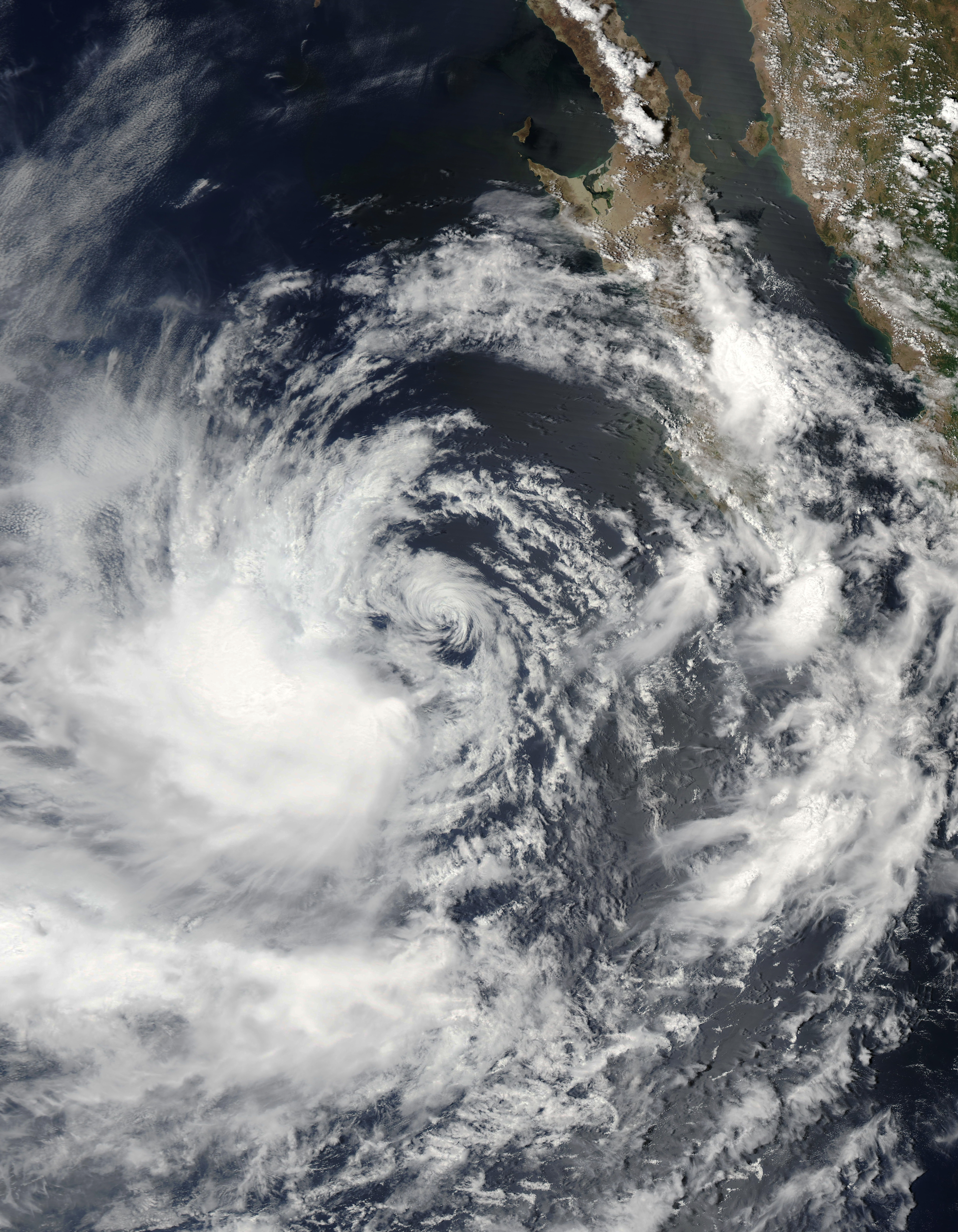
Tropical Storm Kevin near peak intensity late on September 4

- 18:00 UTC (11:00 a.m. PDT) at 21.2°N 114.6°W – Tropical Depression Eleven-E strengthens into Tropical Storm Kevin about 315 mi (510 km) west-southwest of Cabo San Lucas. It simultaneously attains its peak intensity, with maximum sustained winds of 40 mph (65 km/h) and a minimum central pressure of 1000 mbar (29.53 inHg).

September 5

- 00:00 UTC (5:00 p.m. PDT, September 4) at 21.9°N 115.4°W – Tropical Storm Kevin weakens into a tropical depression about 350 mi (565 km) west of Cabo San Lucas.
- 12:00 UTC (2:00 a.m. HST) at 13.4°N 179.2°E – Tropical Depression Jimena crosses the IDL into the Western Pacific basin about 1,710 mi (2,750 km) west-southwest of South Point, and later dissipates.

September 6

- 06:00 UTC (11:00 p.m. PDT, September 5) at 23.8°N 119.0°W – Tropical Depression Kevin degenerates into a remnant low about 575 mi (925 km) west of Cabo San Lucas, and later dissipates.

September 13

- 18:00 UTC (11:00 a.m. PDT) at 14.7°N 108.2°W – Tropical Depression Twelve-E forms from a tropical wave about 390 mi (630 km) southwest of Manzanillo.

September 14

- 12:00 UTC (5:00 a.m. PDT) at 16.5°N 109.6°W – Tropical Depression Twelve-E strengthens into Tropical Storm Linda about 390 mi (630 km) west-southwest of Manzanillo.

September 15

- 12:00 UTC (5:00 a.m. PDT) at 19.0°N 112.5°W – Tropical Storm Linda strengthens into a Category 1 hurricane about 535 mi (860 km) west of Manzanillo, or about 315 mi (510 km) south-southwest of Cabo San Lucas. It simultaneously attains its peak intensity, with maximum sustained winds of 75 mph (120 km/h) and a minimum central pressure of 987 mbar (29.15 inHg).

September 16

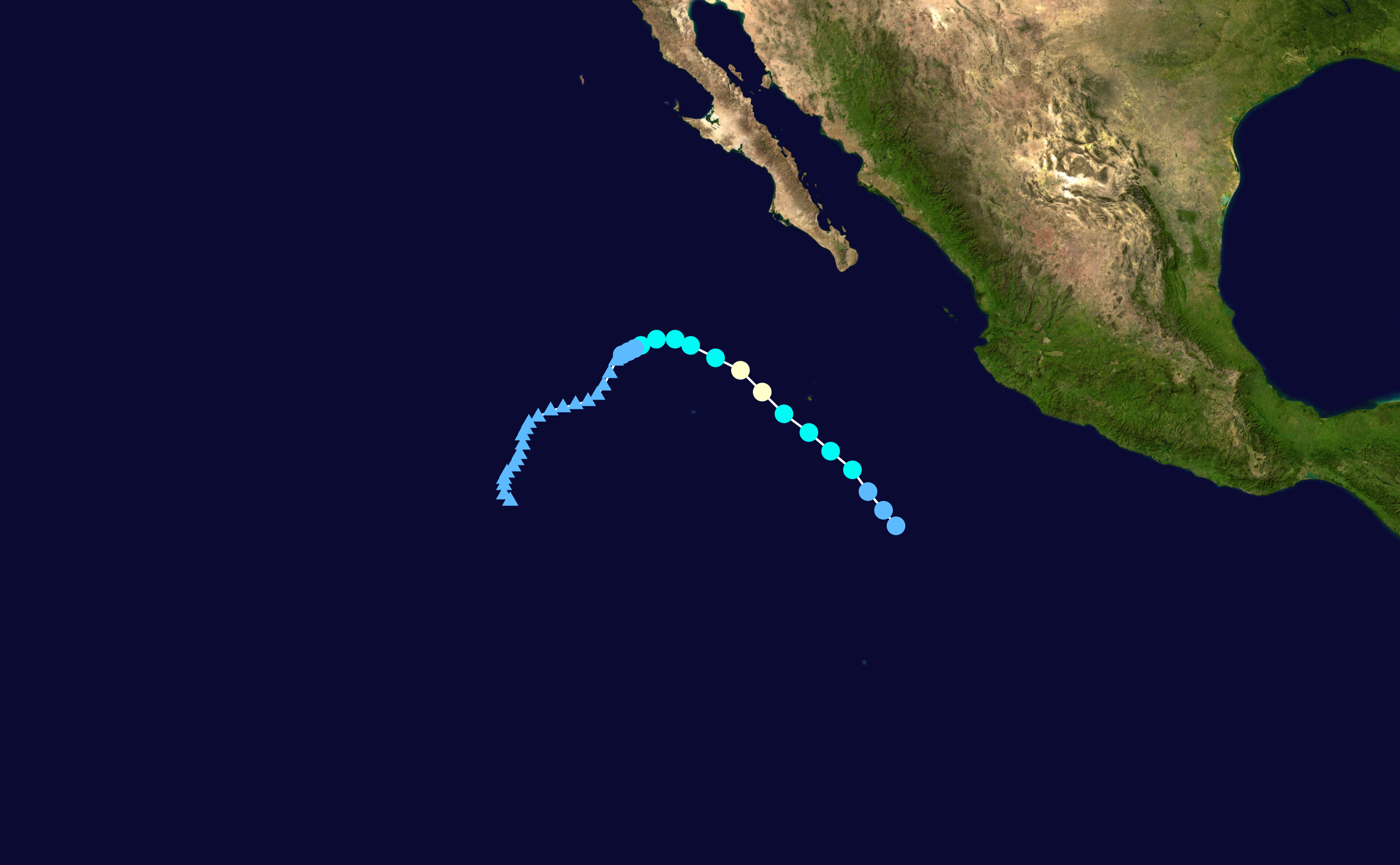
Storm path of Hurricane Linda

- 00:00 UTC (5:00 p.m. PDT, September 15) at 20.1°N 114.0°W – Hurricane Linda weakens into a tropical storm about 320 mi (520 km) southwest of Cabo San Lucas.

September 17

- 06:00 UTC (11:00 p.m. PDT, September 16) at 20.4°N 116.6°W – Tropical Storm Linda weakens into a tropical depression about 460 mi (740 km) west-southwest of Cabo San Lucas.

September 18

- 00:00 UTC (5:00 p.m. PDT, September 17) at 20.0°N 117.2°W – Tropical Depression Linda degenerates into a remnant low about 505 mi (815 km) west-southwest of Cabo San Lucas, and later dissipates.
- 18:00 UTC (11:00 a.m. PDT) at 16.5°N 105.7°W – Tropical Depression Thirteen-E forms from a tropical wave about 520 mi (835 km) south-southeast of Cabo San Lucas.

September 19

- 06:00 UTC (11:00 p.m. PDT, September 18) at 16.9°N 106.8°W – Tropical Depression Thirteen-E strengthens into Tropical Storm Marty about 460 mi (740 km) south-southeast of Cabo San Lucas.

September 21

- 00:00 UTC (5:00 p.m. PDT, September 20) at 18.6°N 108.6°W – Tropical Storm Marty strengthens into a Category 1 hurricane about 310 mi (500 km) south-southeast of Cabo San Lucas.

September 22

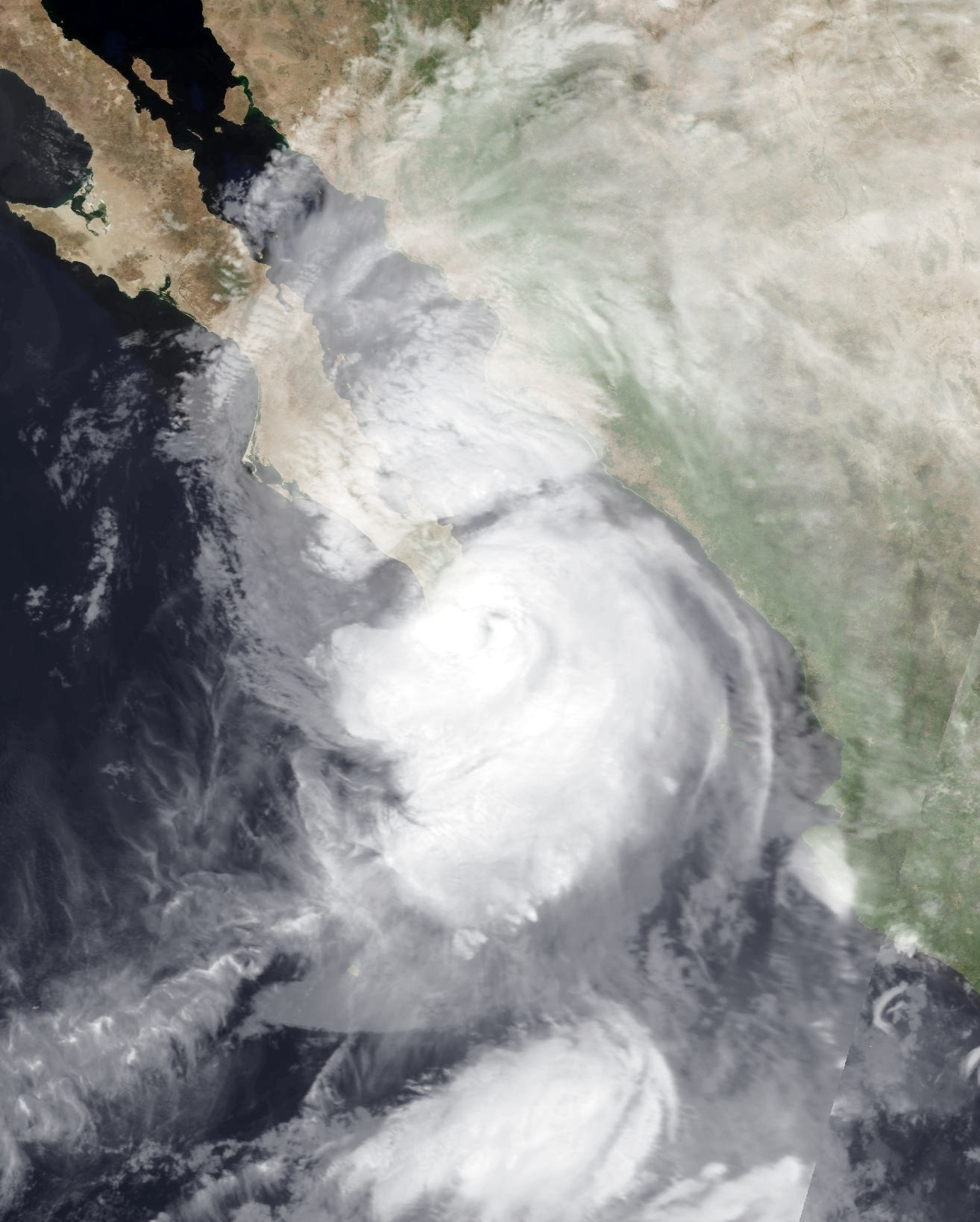
Hurricane Marty making landfall at peak intensity on September 22

- 06:00 UTC (11:00 p.m. PDT, September 21) at 22.0°N 109.6°W – Hurricane Marty strengthens to Category 2 intensity about 65 mi (100 km) south-southeast of Cabo San Lucas. It simultaneously attains its peak intensity, with maximum sustained winds of 100 mph (155 km/h) and a minimum central pressure of 970 mbar (28.64 inHg).
- 09:30 UTC (2:30 a.m. PDT) at 23.0°N 109.7°W – Hurricane Marty makes landfall just northeast of Cabo San Lucas, or near San José del Cabo, Baja California Sur, at its peak intensity.
- 12:00 UTC (5:00 a.m. PDT) at 23.7°N 109.9°W – Hurricane Marty weakens to Category 1 intensity over land about 45 mi (75 km) north-northwest of San José del Cabo, emerging over the Gulf of California shortly thereafter. (Note: In their Tropical Cyclone Report for Hurricane Marty, the NHC noted the possibility that Marty made several more landfalls as it tracked north-northwestward parallel, and very close, to the east coast of the Baja California peninsula.)

September 23

- 00:00 UTC (5:00 p.m. PDT, September 22) at 27.0°N 111.8°W – Hurricane Marty weakens into a tropical storm about 35 mi (55 km) southeast of Santa Rosalía, Baja California Sur.
- 18:00 UTC (11:00 a.m. PDT) at 29.9°N 113.5°W – Tropical Storm Marty weakens into a tropical depression about 190 mi (305 km) north-northwest of Santa Rosalía.

September 25

- 00:00 UTC (5:00 p.m. PDT, September 24) at 31.5°N 114.1°W – Tropical Depression Marty degenerates into a remnant low over the extreme northern Gulf of California about 305 mi (490 km) north-northwest of Santa Rosalía, and later dissipates over the northern Baja California peninsula.

=== October ===
October 1

- 18:00 UTC (11:00 a.m. PDT) at 15.7°N 108.1°W – Tropical Depression Fourteen-E forms from a tropical wave about 510 mi (825 km) south-southeast of Cabo San Lucas.

October 2

- 06:00 UTC (11:00 p.m. PDT, October 1) at 15.6°N 108.7°W – Tropical Depression Fourteen-E strengthens into Tropical Storm Nora about 505 mi (815 km) south of Cabo San Lucas.

October 3

- 06:00 UTC (11:00 p.m. PDT, October 2) at 11.7°N 98.4°W – Tropical Depression Fifteen-E forms from a tropical wave about 375 mi (600 km) south-southeast of Acapulco, Guerrero.
- 12:00 UTC (5:00 a.m. PDT) at 12.1°N 98.9°W – Tropical Depression Fifteen-E strengthens into Tropical Storm Olaf about 335 mi (535 km) south of Acapulco.

October 4

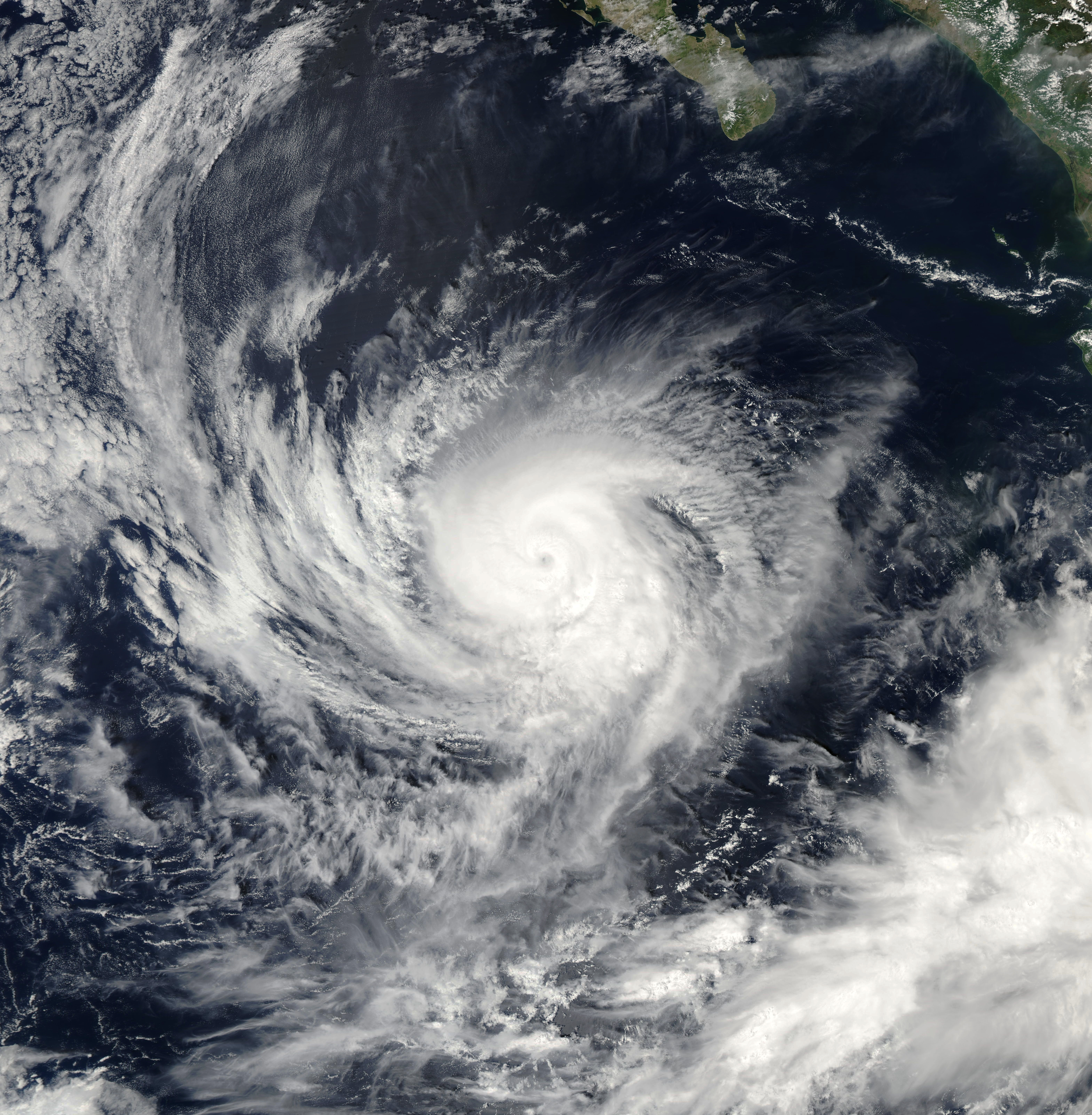
Hurricane Nora near peak intensity late on October 4

- 00:00 UTC (5:00 p.m. PDT, October 3) at 16.2°N 110.3°W – Tropical Storm Nora strengthens into a Category 1 hurricane about 460 mi (740 km) south of Cabo San Lucas.
- 12:00 UTC (5:00 a.m. PDT) at 16.9°N 111.5°W – Hurricane Nora strengthens to Category 2 intensity about 425 mi (685 km) south-southwest of Cabo San Lucas. It simultaneously attains its peak intensity, with maximum sustained winds of 105 mph (165 km/h) and a minimum central pressure of 969 mbar (28.61 inHg), making it the strongest storm of the season.

October 5

- 12:00 UTC (5:00 a.m. PDT) at 16.5°N 104.2°W – Tropical Storm Olaf strengthens into a Category 1 hurricane about 180 mi (285 km) south of Manzanillo. It simultaneously attains its peak intensity, with maximum sustained winds of 75 mph (120 km/h) and a minimum central pressure of 987 mbar (29.15 inHg).
- 18:00 UTC (11:00 a.m. PDT) at 19.3°N 113.6°W – Hurricane Nora weakens to Category 1 intensity about 340 mi (545 km) southwest of Cabo San Lucas.
- 18:00 UTC (11:00 a.m. PDT) at 17.1°N 104.8°W – Hurricane Olaf weakens into a tropical storm about 140 mi (220 km) south-southwest of Manzanillo.

October 6

- 12:00 UTC (5:00 a.m. PDT) at 20.1°N 113.9°W – Hurricane Nora weakens into a tropical storm about 315 mi (510 km) southwest of Cabo San Lucas.

October 7

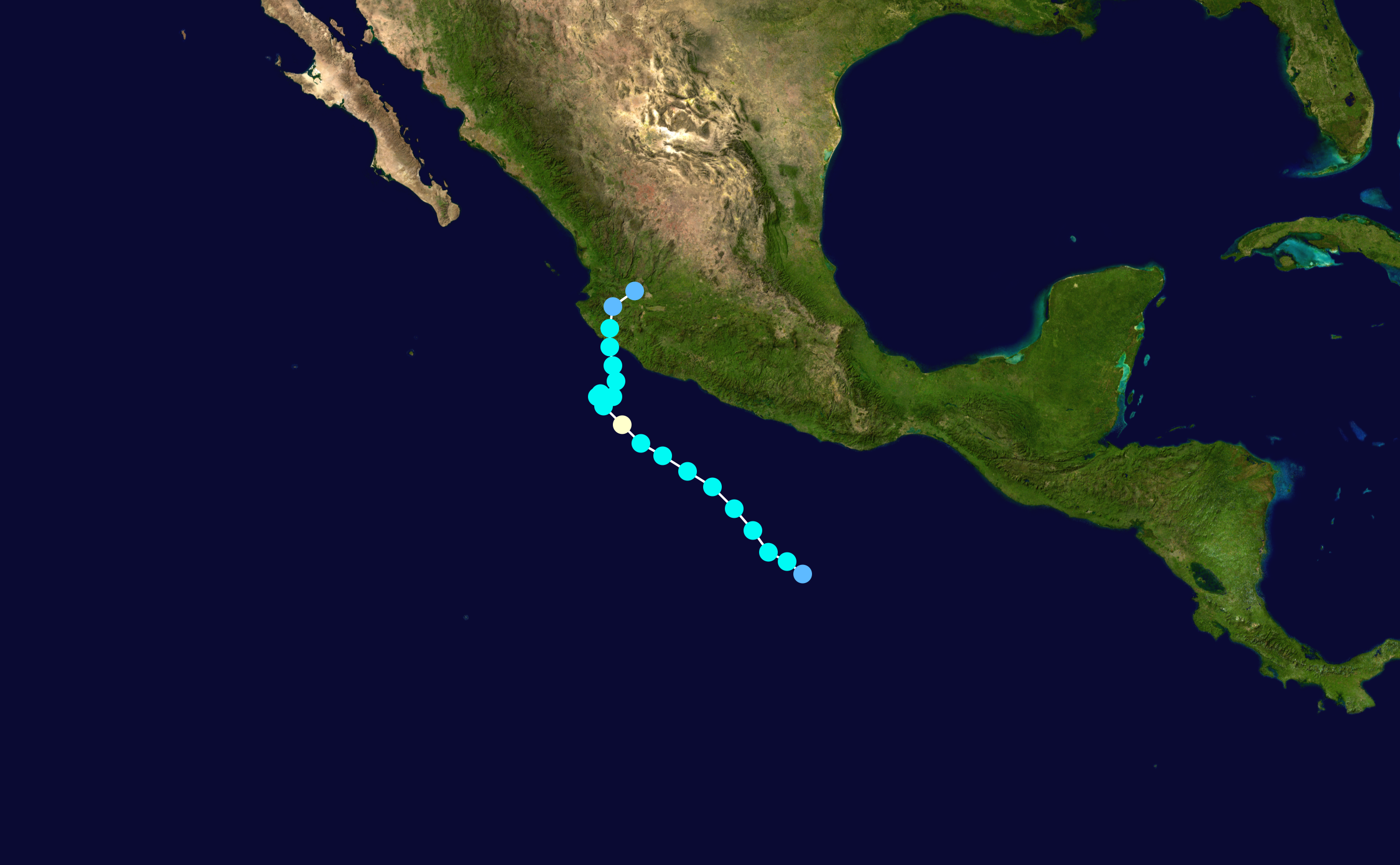
Storm path of Hurricane Olaf

- 06:00 UTC (11:00 p.m. PDT, October 6) at 20.3°N 113.3°W – Tropical Storm Nora weakens into a tropical depression about 275 mi (445 km) southwest of Cabo San Lucas.
- 08:00 UTC (1:00 a.m. PDT) at 19.2°N 104.6°W – Tropical Storm Olaf makes landfall about 15 mi (30 km) west of Manzanillo with maximum sustained winds of 60 mph (95 km/h) and a central pressure of 997 mbar (29.44 inHg).
- 18:00 UTC (11:00 a.m. PDT) at 20.3°N 104.5°W – Tropical Storm Olaf weakens into a tropical depression over land about 85 mi (140 km) north of Manzanillo.

October 8

- 00:00 UTC (5:00 p.m. PDT, October 7) at 20.8°N 103.8°W – Tropical Depression Olaf is last noted as a tropical cyclone over land about 125 mi (205 km) north-northeast of Manzanillo, dissipating shortly thereafter.

October 9

- 06:00 UTC (11:00 p.m. PDT, October 8) at 23.8°N 106.7°W – Tropical Depression Nora makes landfall near Mazatlán, Sinaloa, with maximum sustained winds of 30 mph (45 km/h) and a central pressure of 1004 mbar (29.65 inHg), dissipating shortly thereafter.

October 20

- 12:00 UTC (5:00 a.m. PDT) at 10.0°N 100.3°W – Tropical Depression Sixteen-E forms from a tropical wave about 480 mi (770 km) south of Acapulco.
- 18:00 UTC (11:00 a.m. PDT) at 10.3°N 101.2°W – Tropical Depression Sixteen-E strengthens into Tropical Storm Patricia about 460 mi (740 km) south of Acapulco.

October 21

- 12:00 UTC (5:00 a.m. PDT) at 11.3°N 103.4°W – Tropical Storm Patricia strengthens into a Category 1 hurricane about 450 mi (720 km) south-southwest of Acapulco.

October 22

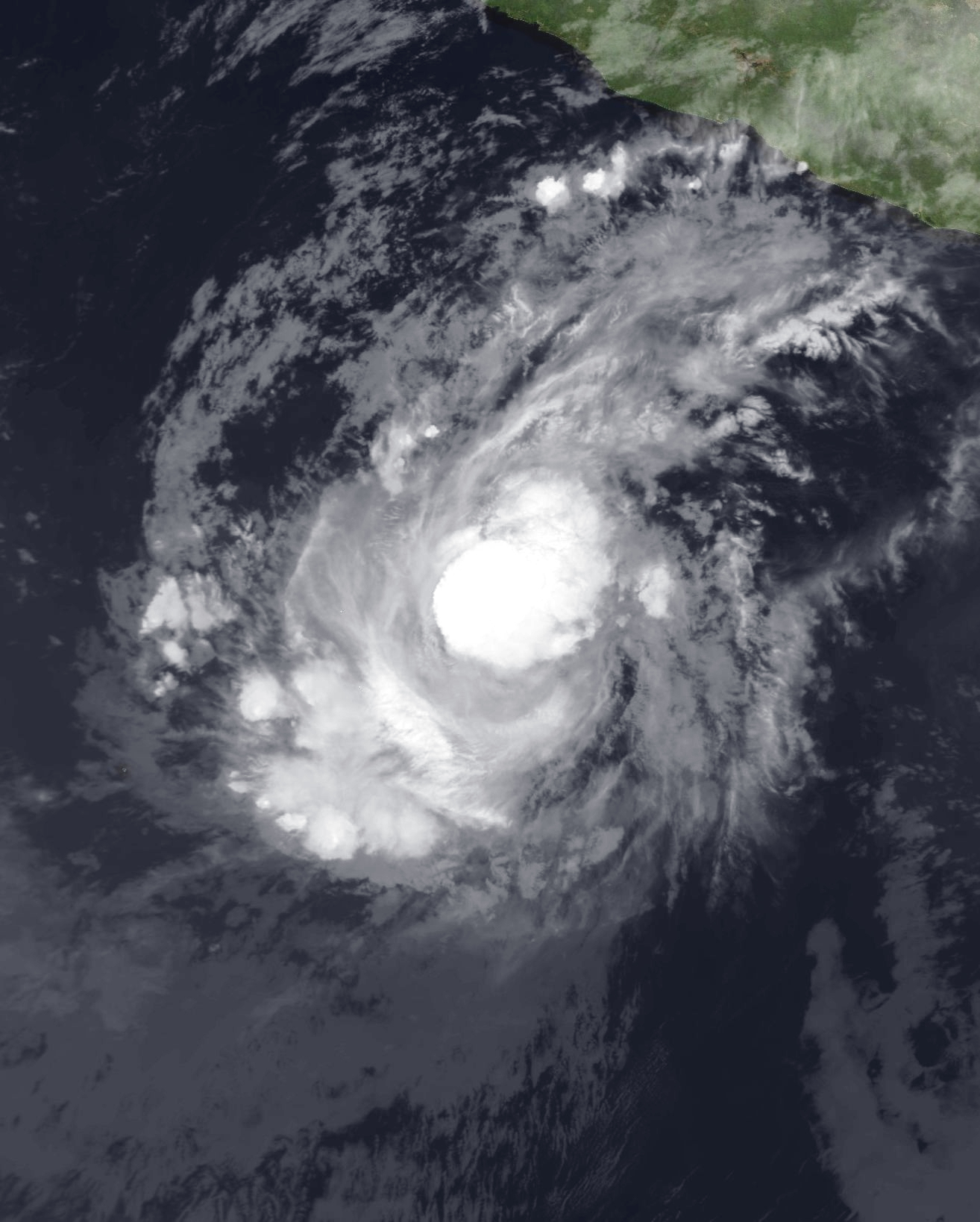
Hurricane Patricia just after peak intensity early on October 22

- 00:00 UTC (5:00 p.m. PDT, October 21) at 11.7°N 105.0°W – Hurricane Patricia attains its peak intensity, with maximum sustained winds of 80 mph (130 km/h) and a minimum central pressure of 984 mbar (29.06 inHg) about 495 mi (795 km) southwest of Acapulco.
- 12:00 UTC (5:00 a.m. PDT) at 12.0°N 106.7°W – Hurricane Patricia weakens into a tropical storm about 565 mi (905 km) southwest of Acapulco, or about 785 mi (1,260 km) south-southeast of Cabo San Lucas.

October 25

- 12:00 UTC (5:00 a.m. PDT) at 15.2°N 114.1°W – Tropical Storm Patricia weakens into a tropical depression about 595 mi (955 km) south-southwest of Cabo San Lucas.

October 26

- 06:00 UTC (11:00 p.m. PDT, October 25) at 15.8°N 115.1°W – Tropical Depression Patricia degenerates into a remnant low about 595 mi (955 km) southwest of Cabo San Lucas, and later dissipates.

=== November ===
There were no tropical cyclones in November.

November 30

- The 2003 Pacific hurricane season officially ends.

== See also ==
- Timeline of the 2003 Atlantic hurricane season
- Pacific hurricane season
- Tropical cyclones in 2003
