= Hurricane Ignacio (2003) =

Category 2 Pacific hurricane in 2003

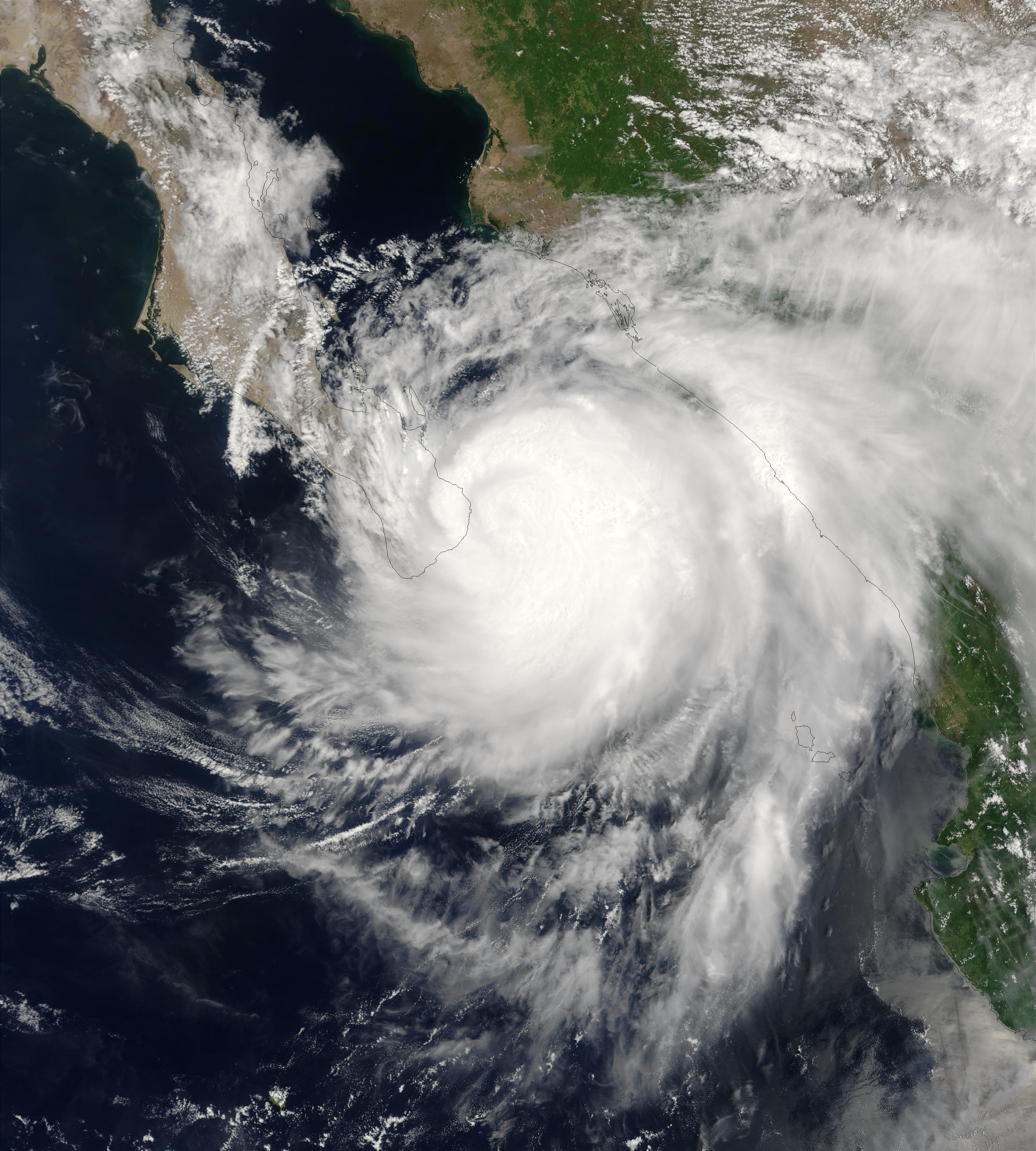
- Hurricane Ignacio at peak intensity on August 24, 2003

Meteorological history
- Formed: August 22, 2003
- Dissipated: August 27, 2003

Category 2 hurricane
- 1-minute sustained (SSHWS/NWS)
- Highest winds: 105 mph (165 km/h)
- Lowest pressure: 970 mbar (hPa); 28.64 inHg

Overall effects
- Fatalities: 4
- Damage: $21.2 million (2003 USD)
- Areas affected: Baja California Peninsula, Sonora, California
- IBTrACS
- Part of the 2003 Pacific hurricane season

Hurricane Ignacio was the latest-forming first hurricane of a Pacific hurricane season since reliable satellite observation began in 1966. The ninth tropical storm of the 2003 Pacific hurricane season, Ignacio developed out of a tropical wave on August 22 a short distance off the coast of Mexico. It was initially predicted to track out to sea and remain a weak tropical storm, though it unexpectedly organized rapidly to attain peak winds of 105 mph (169 km/h) on August 24 while located a short distance southeast of southern Baja California Sur. Land interaction weakened Ignacio to an 80 mph (130 km/h) hurricane by the time it made landfall near La Paz, and it dissipated on August 27 in the central Baja California peninsula.

The hurricane produced heavy rainfall across Baja California Sur, which resulted in flooding. Statewide, four people were killed, and damage was estimated at $21.2 million. (Note: All currencies are converted from Mexican pesos to United States Dollars using this with an exchange rate of the year 2003.) (Note: All damage totals are in 2003 values of their respective currencies.) Resort areas near the coast experienced minor effects, though further inland the damage was more severe. The impact of Ignacio was compounded by flooding from Hurricane Marty a month later, with damage from the two hurricanes totaling about $1 billion (2003 US).

== Meteorological history ==
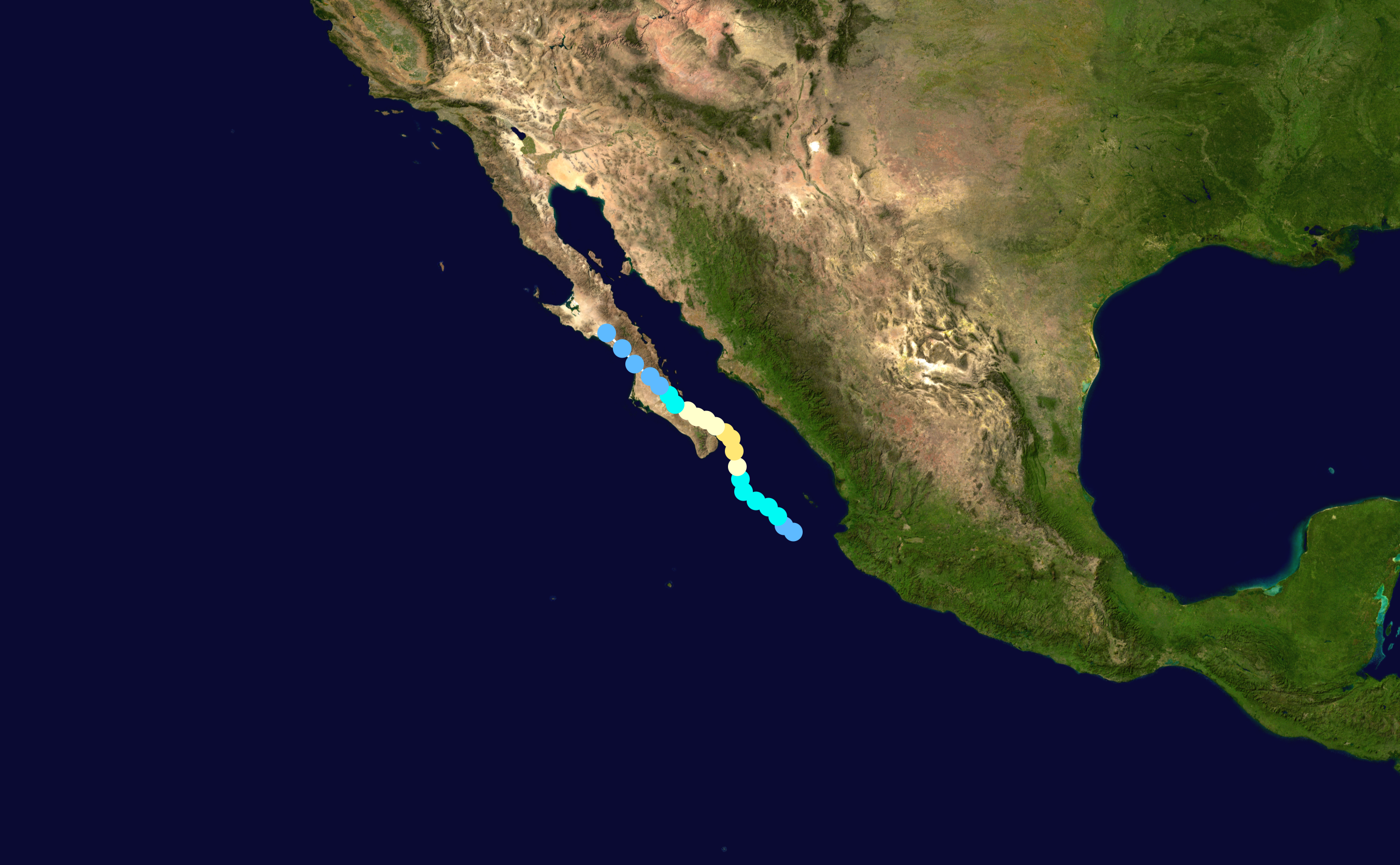
Map plotting the storm's track and intensity, according to the Saffir–Simpson scale Map key Saffir–Simpson scale Tropical depression (≤38 mph, ≤62 km/h) Tropical storm (39–73 mph, 63–118 km/h) Category 1 (74–95 mph, 119–153 km/h) Category 2 (96–110 mph, 154–177 km/h) Category 3 (111–129 mph, 178–208 km/h) Category 4 (130–156 mph, 209–251 km/h) Category 5 (≥157 mph, ≥252 km/h) Unknown Storm type Tropical cyclone Subtropical cyclone Extratropical cyclone, remnant low, tropical disturbance, or monsoon depression

A tropical wave exited the coast of Africa on August 6. It moved westward across the Atlantic Ocean without development, and entered the eastern Pacific Ocean on August 16 after crossing Central America. Cloudiness and convection gradually increased along the wave axis and organized into a distinct area of disturbed weather on August 20 while located a short distance south of Manzanillo, Mexico. It slowly became better organized as it moved northwestward in an area favorable for continued development. With light vertical wind shear and warm water temperatures, the convection concentrated around a developing low-level circulation, and on August 22 it organized enough for the National Hurricane Center to classify it as Tropical Depression Nine-E while it was located about 115 miles (185 km) west of the Mexico mainland or about 220 miles (350 km) southeast of the southern tip of the Baja California Peninsula. With an anticyclone located over the southwestern United States and a ridge extending southward into northwestern Mexico, the National Hurricane Center initially predicted the depression to track generally west-northwestward out to sea and reach peak winds of 50 mph (80 km/h).

The tropical depression moved slowly northwestward, with the slow motion persisting for its entire lifetime due to the storm being embedded within the weakness of a mid-level ridge to its north. Shortly after forming, the storm was located in a marginally favorable environment, with westerly wind shear and dry air approaching the depression and leaving the center of circulation exposed from the convection. However, the wind shear subsequently decreased, and early on August 23 the depression intensified into Tropical Storm Ignacio. The storm quickly organized and developed well-defined banding features and very well-organized upper-level outflow, and by late on August 23 a warm spot formed in the center of the convection. The warm spot organized into an intermittent eye feature. Early on August 24, Ignacio attained hurricane status, the latest formation of the first hurricane of a season recorded in the East Pacific since reliable satellite observation began in 1966.

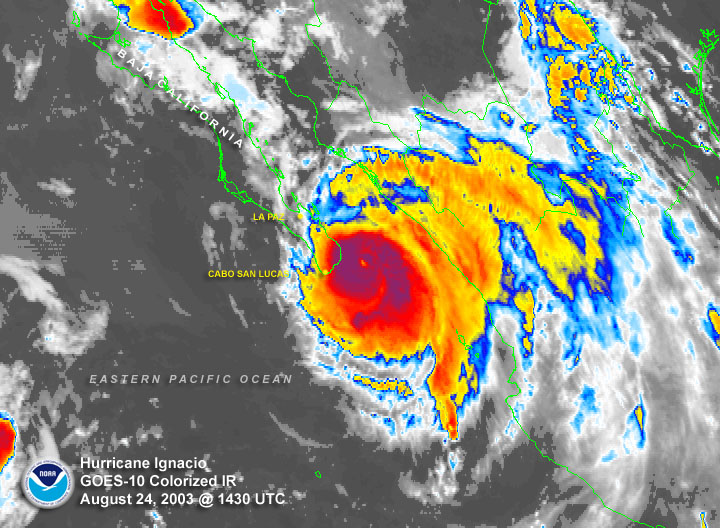
Hurricane Ignacio near Baja California Peninsula on August 24

Hurricane Ignacio continued to quickly intensify after becoming a hurricane, and reached peak winds of 105 mph (169 km/h) later on August 24 while located within 30 miles (48 km)/h) off the coast of Baja California Sur. Upon reaching peak strength, the hurricane possessed a 12 miles (19 km) wide eye surrounded by very deep convection. The National Hurricane Center predicted it to attain major hurricane status and potentially reach significantly higher winds if the center remained over open water. However, it turned to the northwest and paralleled the Baja California Peninsula a short distance offshore, resulting in a steady weakening trend due to its interaction with the high terrain. On August 25 Ignacio made landfall just east of La Paz with winds of 80 mph (130 km/h). It rapidly weakened over land, first deteriorating to a tropical storm 12 hours after landfall and later to a tropical depression about a day after moving ashore. Ignacio continued northwestward across the peninsula, and dissipated on August 28 while located in northwestern Baja California Sur.

== Preparations ==
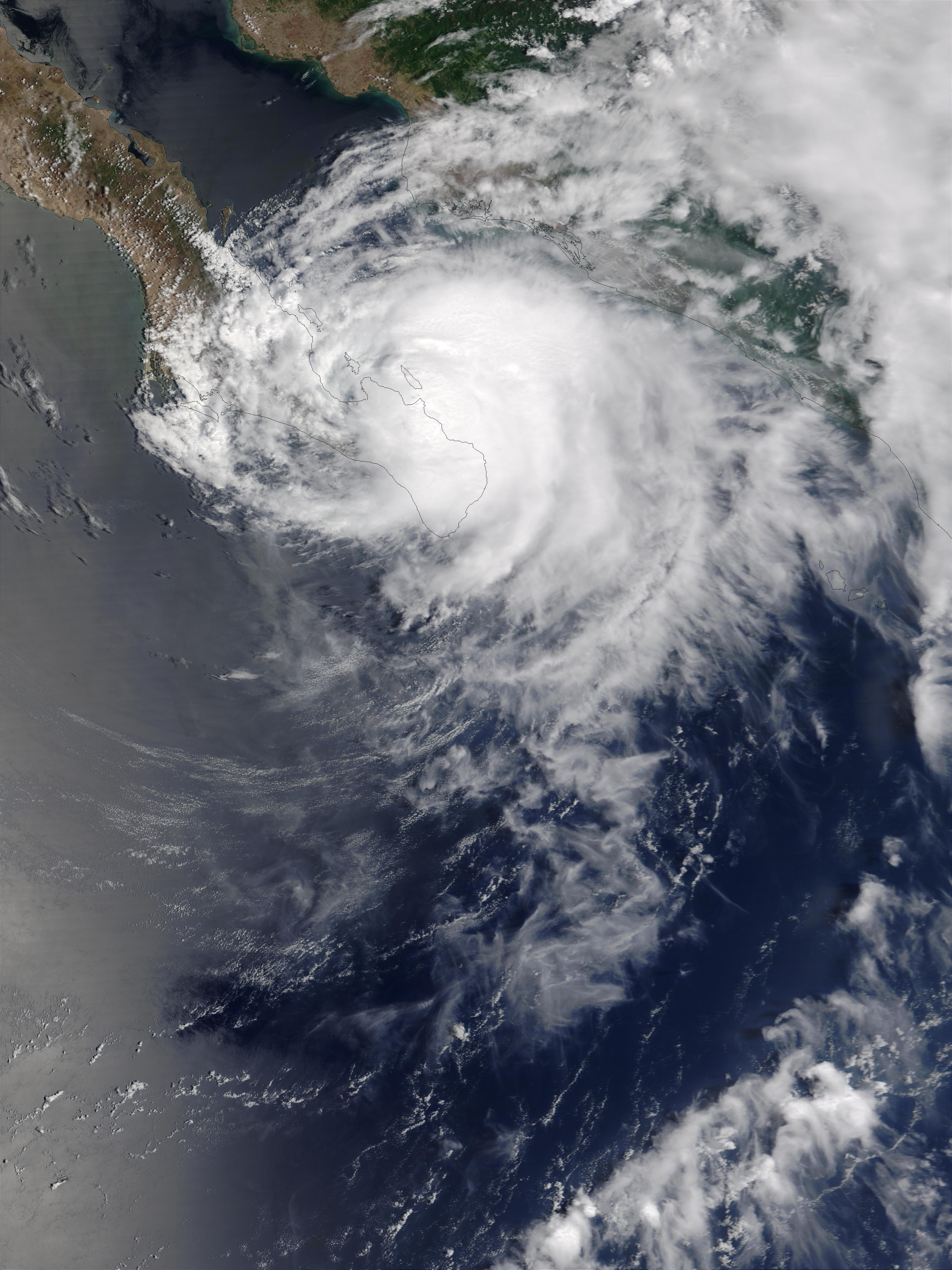
Hurricane Ignacio making landfall in Baja California Peninsula on August 25

Coinciding with the issuance of the first advisory on Ignacio, the government of Mexico issued a tropical storm watch from Santa Fe to La Paz, with the watch upgraded to a warning nine hours later. The warning was extended on both coasts from Bahia Magdalena to San Evaristo the next day. About 48 hours before Ignacio made landfall, a hurricane warning was issued from Santa Fe to La Paz, and 21 hours later extended to Bahia Magdalena and San Evaristo. The government of Mexico also issued a tropical storm warning for the mainland from Altata to Topolobampo in the state of Sinaloa.

The Civil Protection agency for the state of Baja California Sur ordered for the evacuation for 10,000 residents in flood-prone areas near La Paz. Officials also moved 700 people in areas near rivers to shelters in Los Cabos. 32 emergency shelters were set up in and around La Paz. Residents near the coast placed sandbags to protect their houses from potential flooding, and also stocked up on hurricane supplies. Police authorities were stationed in areas around Los Cabos to guard against price gouging. Officials closed many schools and businesses throughout the area, and also shut down the area's primary airport in La Paz. About 500 people in Sinaloa were evacuated, as well.

== Impact ==
Prior to developing, the precursor tropical disturbance dropped heavy rainfall and produced gusty winds, primarily from Zihuatanejo in the state of Guerrero to Manzanillo in the state of Colima. The slow motion of Ignacio produced heavy rainfall across the southern portion of the Baja California Peninsula, including a peak 24‑hour total of 7.25 inches (184 mm) in Ciudad Constitución. The National Hurricane Center warned of rainfall totals of up to 20 inches (510 mm) in some localized areas, which did verify in Los Cabos. Ignacio produced strong waves which hit the eastern Baja California coastline. Swells of 10 feet (3.0 m) in height in La Paz closed the city's small port.

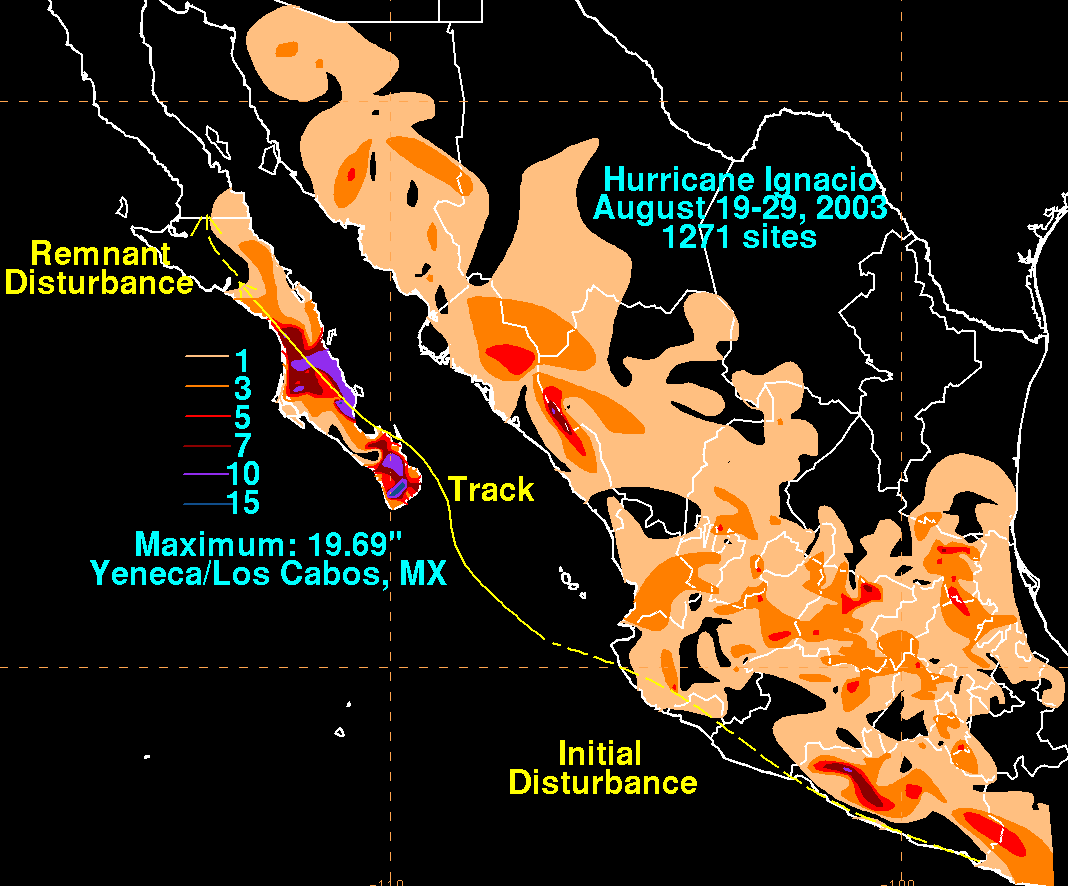
Rainfall from Hurricane Ignacio across Mexico.

Hurricane-force winds blew down trees, signs, and power lines in and around La Paz, while closer to the beach the hurricane destroyed multiple beach huts. Rough surf in the harbor of La Paz sunk one fishing vessel and grounded four others. Efforts by the Mexican Navy prevented an additional vessel and two cruise ships from being grounded. In Cabo San Lucas, effects were minimal, amounting to light winds and rain of less than 2 inches (51 mm). The passage of the hurricane left citizens in Todos Santos without power for around 24 hours. Heavy rainfall caused severe inland flooding, destroying bridges and multiple mudslides, some of which blocked roads. Flash flooding in desert inland areas washed out roads, causing the Mexican government to restrict traffic through much of the peninsula for up to a week after the storm. Many roads remained impassable for a month after the hurricane. The closed roads and the airport in La Paz and southern Baja California left some tourists stranded. The rainfall was welcome in some desert areas, where the moderate precipitation filled reservoirs. Two rescue workers died when they were swept away by the floodwaters. Six municipalities in Baja California were declared disaster areas, and by four days after landfall, the Mexican government prepared emergency funds to meet the immediate needs of the affected citizens. Due to the storm's slow movement, rainfall was high and the resulting flooding was severe, and Ignacio was responsible for approximately US$21.2 million of damage. Two rescue workers drowned in the flood waters brought by the storm and some 10,000 people were evacuated to shelters. Statewide, four people were killed, 1,198 homes were damaged, 4,146 ha (10,240 acres) of crops were destroyed, and one school was also destroyed.

Heavy rainfall was also reported in Sinaloa on the Mexican mainland. The remnants of Ignacio produced thunderstorm activity in high terrain areas of central interior California. Over 300 lightning strikes from the remnant moisture was recorded in a one-hour period. The lightning caused 14 forest fires in Merced County, resulting in a loss of power to over 3,500 customers in and around the Atwater area.

Just a month after Ignacio, Hurricane Marty passed through the area, causing additional damage to areas hit by Ignacio. The combined damage from the two hurricanes totaled about $1 billion (2003 USD, $1.1 billion 2006 USD), and the effects from the two storms left at least 50,000 homeless.

== See also ==
- Tropical cyclones in 2003
- Weather of 2003
- Other tropical cyclones named Ignacio
- List of Pacific hurricanes
- List of Baja California hurricanes
- Timeline of the 2003 Pacific hurricane season
- Tropical Storm Fausto (2020)- Remnants of storm in California and sparked Wildfires
- Hurricane Olaf (2021) – Impacted Baja California in 2021
