= List of storms named Ignacio =

The name Ignacio has been used for eight tropical cyclones in the Eastern Pacific Ocean.

- Hurricane Ignacio (1979) – Category 4 hurricane that made landfall as a tropical depression in southwestern Mexico
- Hurricane Ignacio (1985) – Category 4 hurricane that briefly affected Hawaii
- Tropical Storm Ignacio (1991) – strong tropical storm that caused deadly flooding in southwestern Mexico
- Tropical Storm Ignacio (1997) – weak tropical storm whose remnants affected the U.S. West Coast
- Hurricane Ignacio (2003) – Category 2 hurricane that made landfall on southern Baja California Sur
- Tropical Storm Ignacio (2009) – moderate tropical storm that didn’t affect land
- Hurricane Ignacio (2015) – powerful and long-lived Category 4 hurricane over the open ocean
- Tropical Storm Ignacio (2021) – weak tropical storm that didn’t affect land
