= Hurricane Marty (2003) =

Category 2 Pacific hurricane in 2003

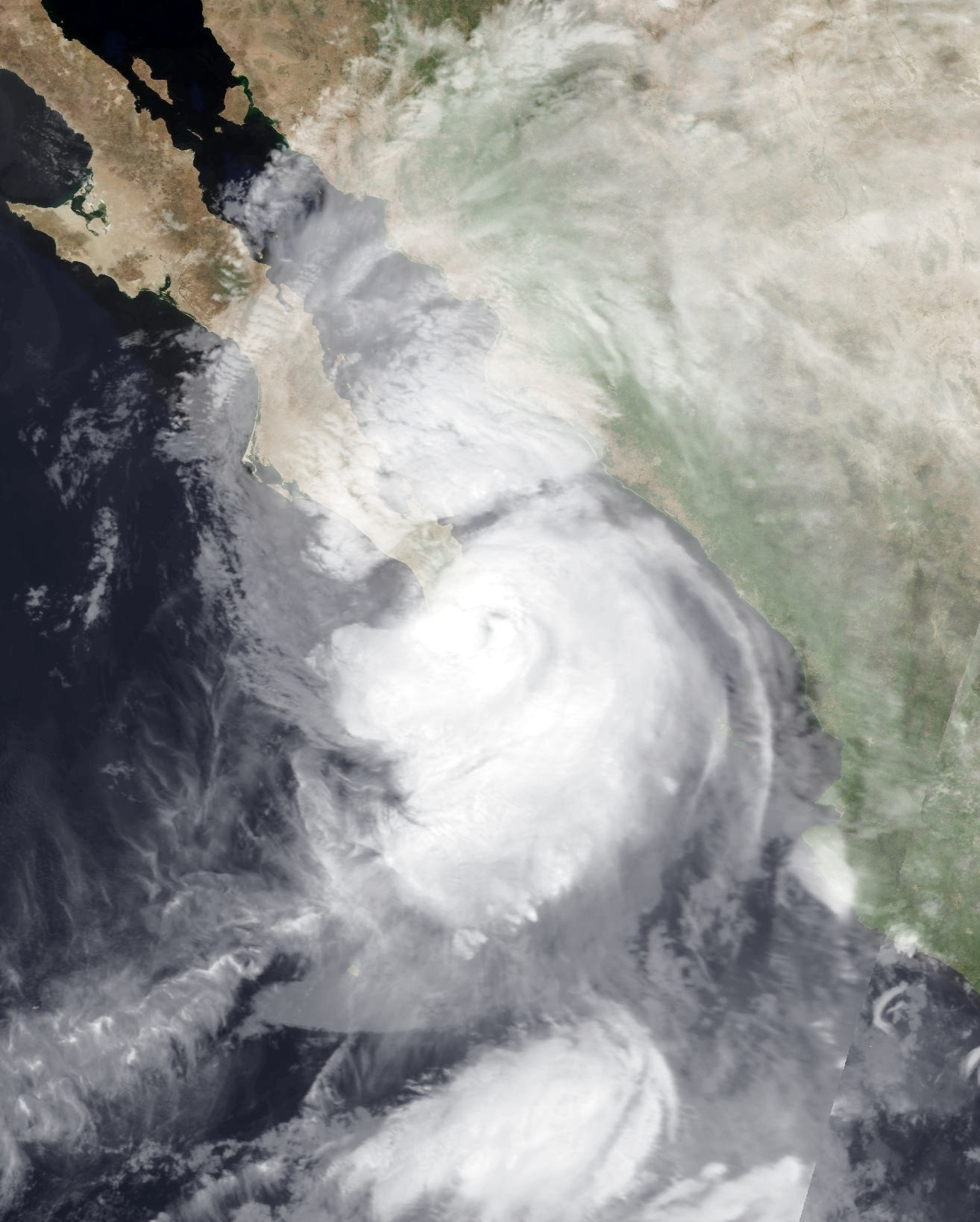
- Hurricane Marty at peak intensity nearing landfall on September 22

Meteorological history
- Formed: September 18, 2003
- Dissipated: September 24, 2003

Category 2 hurricane
- 1-minute sustained (SSHWS/NWS)
- Highest winds: 100 mph (155 km/h)
- Lowest pressure: 970 mbar (hPa); 28.64 inHg

Overall effects
- Fatalities: 12 direct
- Damage: $100 million (2003 USD)
- Areas affected: Baja California Peninsula, Sonora, Sinaloa, Arizona
- IBTrACS
- Part of the 2003 Pacific hurricane season

Hurricane Marty was a Category 2 Pacific hurricane that caused extensive flooding and damage in northwestern Mexico just weeks after Hurricane Ignacio took a similar course. Marty was the thirteenth named storm, fourth hurricane, and the deadliest tropical cyclone of the 2003 Pacific hurricane season. Forming on September 18, it became the 13th tropical storm and fourth hurricane of the year. The storm moved generally northwestward and steadily intensified despite only a marginally favorable environment for development, and became a Category 2 hurricane before making two landfalls on the Baja California peninsula and mainland Mexico.

The hurricane was responsible for significant flooding and storm surges that caused $100 million (2003 USD) in damage mostly on the peninsula of Baja California, and resulted in the deaths of 12 people. Marty affected many of the same areas that had been affected by Hurricane Ignacio a month earlier.

== Meteorological history ==
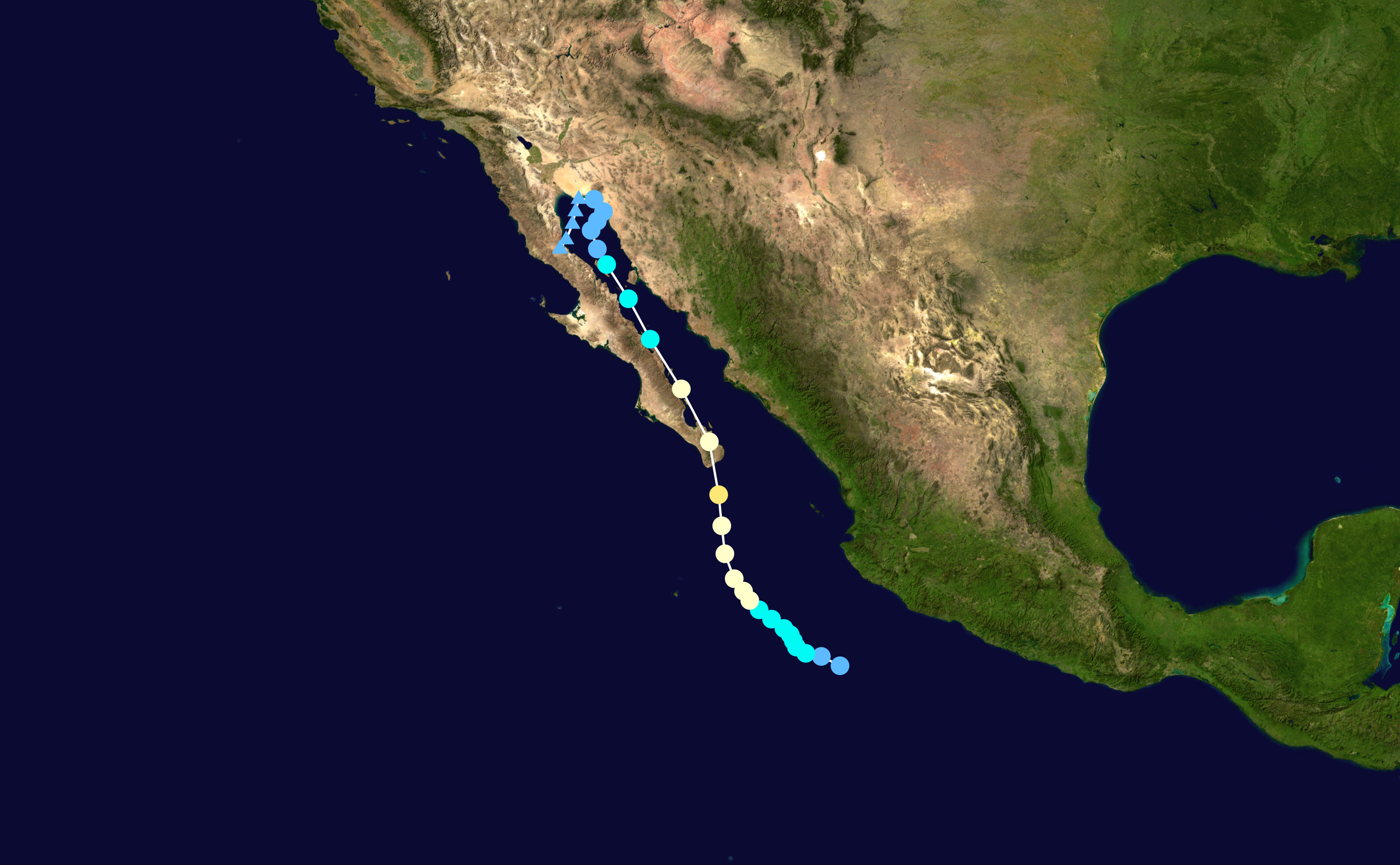
Map plotting the storm's track and intensity, according to the Saffir–Simpson scale Map key Saffir–Simpson scale Tropical depression (≤38 mph, ≤62 km/h) Tropical storm (39–73 mph, 63–118 km/h) Category 1 (74–95 mph, 119–153 km/h) Category 2 (96–110 mph, 154–177 km/h) Category 3 (111–129 mph, 178–208 km/h) Category 4 (130–156 mph, 209–251 km/h) Category 5 (≥157 mph, ≥252 km/h) Unknown Storm type Tropical cyclone Subtropical cyclone Extratropical cyclone, remnant low, tropical disturbance, or monsoon depression

A tropical wave moved into the Pacific Ocean from Central America on September 10. Convection along the wave became better organized as it moved westward, and a tropical depression developed on September 18. The depression moved generally west-northwestward before strengthening into Tropical Storm Marty on September 19. The storm entrained dry air into its circulation as it curved toward the northwest, disrupting the storm's convective structure and inhibiting further intensification for the next two days. Eventually, Marty fought off the dry air and intensified, reaching hurricane strength on September 21.

Marty began moving north-northwestward in response to a high pressure ridge to the west, and continued to strengthen, reaching a peak intensity of 100 mph (160 km/h) early on September 22. Marty then moved northward at an increased speed before making landfall 10 mi (16 km) northeast of Cabo San Lucas in Baja California Sur later that day. After making landfall, Marty turned back to the north-northwest, moving parallel to the eastern coast of the peninsula, and weakening to a tropical storm on September 23. Marty then stalled over the Gulf of California after encountering a high pressure system over the U.S. state of Nevada, and further weakened to a tropical depression before making a second landfall near Puerto Peñasco, Sonora, on September 24. Marty became a remnant low pressure area on September 25, and moved erratically over the northern Gulf of California for the next two days before drifting southwestward and dissipating over the northern Baja California Peninsula on September 26.

== Preparations ==
Fearing a repeat of the damage left by Hurricane Ignacio a month earlier, many residents stocked up on supplies, secured their homes and evacuated to emergency shelters. The government of Mexico issued hurricane warnings for areas of the eastern coast of the Baja California Peninsula and the west coast of the mainland on September 21. Tropical storm warnings were issued for the Mexican coastline to the Colorado River on September 23, but were discontinued later that day. Forecasters also predicted that the hurricane might cause 4–6 feet (1.2–1.8 m) of storm surge, 8 inches (20 cm) of rain, serious flash flooding, and mudslides. Many schools and tourist destinations were used as emergency shelters and most seaports and airports were closed down. Across the Gulf of California, in the state of Sonora, authorities of the municipality of Empalme monitored the status of the Punta de Agua dam, located 20 mi (32 km) upstream of the municipal seat, which threatened to overtop and flood the city. As a result, 300 residents were evacuated to shelters on higher ground.

== Impact ==
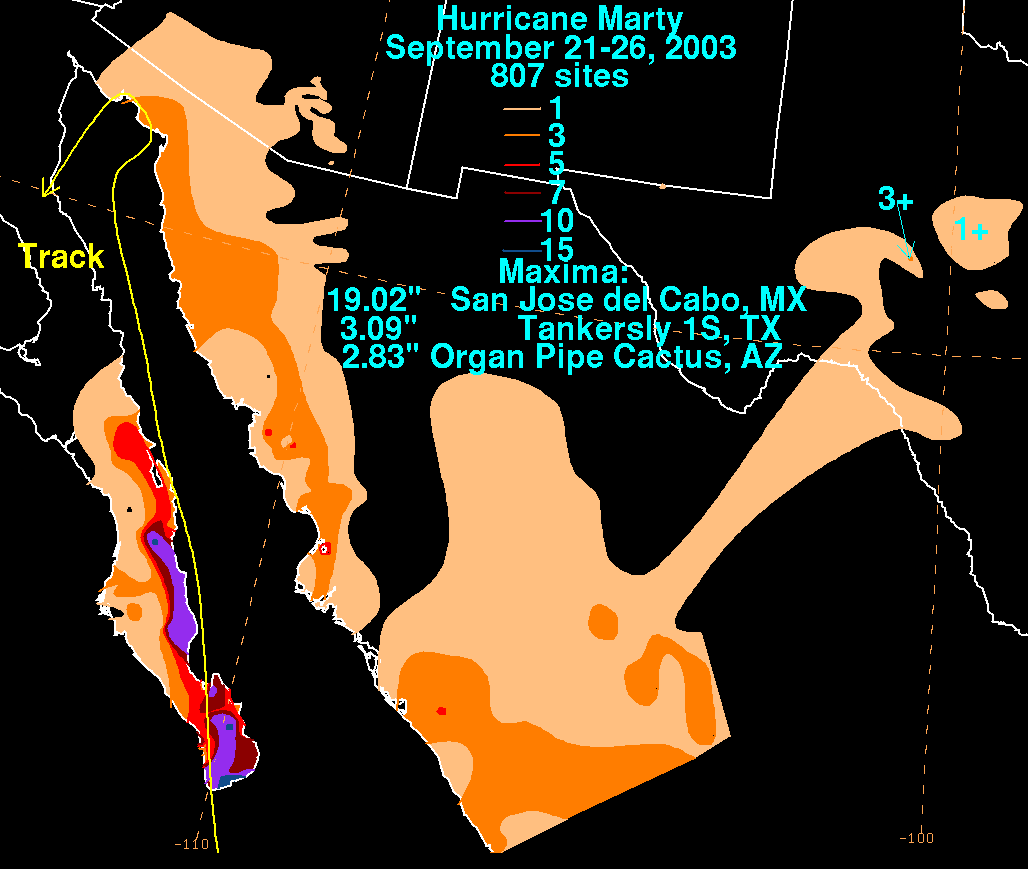
Hurricane Marty storm total rainfall

Overall, Marty killed 12 people, making it the deadliest storm of the 2003 season. Moreover, Marty was also the costliest tropical cyclone to affect Mexico that year.

About 8 to 11 inches (203 to 279 millimetres) of rain fell in areas of the Baja California Peninsula, with the largest 24-hour rainfall total occurring at Todos Santos, Baja California Sur, where 7.77 in (197 mm) of rain fell. Numerous ships offshore reported tropical storm and hurricane-force winds, and an automated weather station in Cabo San Lucas, Baja California Sur reported sustained winds of 85 mph (137 km/h) with gusts to 115 mph (185 km/h). Santa Rosalía, Baja California Sur, reported 7.8 inches (200 mm) of rain. Hurricane Marty damaged or destroyed over 4,000 homes. A 5-foot (1.5 m) storm surge flooded parts of La Paz, and sank 35 yachts moored in various ports. Five people drowned after their cars were swept away by floodwaters while trying to cross a flooded stream. The floods also damaged 4,000-6,000 homes and buildings and significantly disrupted water and communications for an extended period of time. Filming for the 2004 film Troy was interrupted when this hurricane moved through Baja California. Minor beach erosion was reported at San Felipe, Baja California. As a result, the Baja California Sur municipalities of La Paz, Los Cabos, Loreto, Comondú, and Mulegé were declared national disaster areas. Overall, 6,000 people were affected and total damage from the storm was $100 million.

On the mainland, the largest daily rainfall total occurred on Sebampo, Sonora, which recorded 6.73 in (171 mm) of rain. Five fishermen drowned when their fishing boat sank in the Gulf of California, off the coast of Sonora. Also in that state, the University of Sonora suspended operations in its Navojoa campus. Two more people died when a tree fell on a car in Sinaloa. Heavy rainfall caused moderate to severe flash flooding in Sonora and Sinaloa, although damage was not as severe or as extensive as on the Baja California peninsula. Los Mochis, Sinaloa, reported sustained winds of 45 mph (72 km/h) on September 22.

The outer bands of Marty brought locally heavy rains to extreme southwestern Arizona, but there were no reports of flooding. The highest rain total was 2.25 inches (57 mm) at Organ Pipe Cactus National Monument in Arizona. Rainfall extended eastward into Texas, where a storm peak of 3.09 inches (78 mm) of rain occurred in Tankersly.

== See also ==
- Tropical cyclones in 2003
- Weather of 2003
- Other storms named Marty
- List of wettest tropical cyclones in Arizona
- Hurricane Olaf (2021) – took a similar path and impacted similar areas
