= 2003 hurricane season =

2003 hurricane season may refer to:

- 2003 Atlantic hurricane season
- 2003 Pacific hurricane season
